The Lepidoptera of Hungary consist of both the butterflies and moths recorded from Hungary.

Butterflies

Hesperiidae
Carcharodus alceae (Esper, 1780)
Carcharodus floccifera (Zeller, 1847)
Carcharodus lavatherae (Esper, 1783)
Carcharodus orientalis Reverdin, 1913
Carterocephalus palaemon (Pallas, 1771)
Erynnis tages (Linnaeus, 1758)
Hesperia comma (Linnaeus, 1758)
Heteropterus morpheus (Pallas, 1771)
Ochlodes sylvanus (Esper, 1777)
Pyrgus alveus (Hübner, 1803)
Pyrgus armoricanus (Oberthür, 1910)
Pyrgus carthami (Hübner, 1813)
Pyrgus malvae (Linnaeus, 1758)
Pyrgus serratulae (Rambur, 1839)
Pyrgus sidae (Esper, 1784)
Spialia orbifer (Hübner, 1823)
Spialia sertorius (Hoffmannsegg, 1804)
Thymelicus acteon (Rottemburg, 1775)
Thymelicus lineola (Ochsenheimer, 1808)
Thymelicus sylvestris (Poda, 1761)

Lycaenidae
Aricia agestis (Denis & Schiffermüller, 1775)
Aricia artaxerxes (Fabricius, 1793)
Callophrys rubi (Linnaeus, 1758)
Celastrina argiolus (Linnaeus, 1758)
Cupido minimus (Fuessly, 1775)
Cupido osiris (Meigen, 1829)
Cupido alcetas (Hoffmannsegg, 1804)
Cupido argiades (Pallas, 1771)
Cupido decolorata (Staudinger, 1886)
Cyaniris semiargus (Rottemburg, 1775)
Eumedonia eumedon (Esper, 1780)
Favonius quercus (Linnaeus, 1758)
Glaucopsyche alexis (Poda, 1761)
Iolana iolas (Ochsenheimer, 1816)
Kretania sephirus (Frivaldszky, 1835)
Lampides boeticus (Linnaeus, 1767)
Leptotes pirithous (Linnaeus, 1767)
Lycaena alciphron (Rottemburg, 1775)
Lycaena dispar (Haworth, 1802)
Lycaena helle (Denis & Schiffermüller, 1775)
Lycaena hippothoe (Linnaeus, 1761)
Lycaena phlaeas (Linnaeus, 1761)
Lycaena thersamon (Esper, 1784)
Lycaena tityrus (Poda, 1761)
Lycaena virgaureae (Linnaeus, 1758)
Lysandra bellargus (Rottemburg, 1775)
Lysandra coridon (Poda, 1761)
Phengaris alcon (Denis & Schiffermüller, 1775)
Phengaris arion (Linnaeus, 1758)
Phengaris nausithous (Bergstrasser, 1779)
Phengaris teleius (Bergstrasser, 1779)
Plebejus argus (Linnaeus, 1758)
Plebejus argyrognomon (Bergstrasser, 1779)
Plebejus idas (Linnaeus, 1761)
Polyommatus admetus (Esper, 1783)
Polyommatus damon (Denis & Schiffermüller, 1775)
Polyommatus ripartii (Freyer, 1830)
Polyommatus daphnis (Denis & Schiffermüller, 1775)
Polyommatus amandus (Schneider, 1792)
Polyommatus dorylas (Denis & Schiffermüller, 1775)
Polyommatus icarus (Rottemburg, 1775)
Polyommatus thersites (Cantener, 1835)
Pseudophilotes vicrama (Moore, 1865)
Satyrium acaciae (Fabricius, 1787)
Satyrium ilicis (Esper, 1779)
Satyrium pruni (Linnaeus, 1758)
Satyrium spini (Denis & Schiffermüller, 1775)
Satyrium w-album (Knoch, 1782)
Scolitantides orion (Pallas, 1771)
Thecla betulae (Linnaeus, 1758)

Nymphalidae
Aglais io (Linnaeus, 1758)
Aglais urticae (Linnaeus, 1758)
Apatura ilia (Denis & Schiffermüller, 1775)
Apatura iris (Linnaeus, 1758)
Apatura metis Freyer, 1829
Aphantopus hyperantus (Linnaeus, 1758)
Araschnia levana (Linnaeus, 1758)
Arethusana arethusa (Denis & Schiffermüller, 1775)
Argynnis paphia (Linnaeus, 1758)
Argynnis laodice (Pallas, 1771)
Argynnis pandora (Denis & Schiffermüller, 1775)
Boloria dia (Linnaeus, 1767)
Boloria euphrosyne (Linnaeus, 1758)
Boloria selene (Denis & Schiffermüller, 1775)
Boloria eunomia (Esper, 1799)
Brenthis daphne (Bergstrasser, 1780)
Brenthis hecate (Denis & Schiffermüller, 1775)
Brenthis ino (Rottemburg, 1775)
Brintesia circe (Fabricius, 1775)
Chazara briseis (Linnaeus, 1764)
Coenonympha arcania (Linnaeus, 1761)
Coenonympha glycerion (Borkhausen, 1788)
Coenonympha oedippus (Fabricius, 1787)
Coenonympha pamphilus (Linnaeus, 1758)
Erebia aethiops (Esper, 1777)
Erebia euryale (Esper, 1805)
Erebia ligea (Linnaeus, 1758)
Erebia medusa (Denis & Schiffermüller, 1775)
Euphydryas aurinia (Rottemburg, 1775)
Euphydryas maturna (Linnaeus, 1758)
Fabriciana adippe (Denis & Schiffermüller, 1775)
Fabriciana niobe (Linnaeus, 1758)
Hipparchia fagi (Scopoli, 1763)
Hipparchia statilinus (Hufnagel, 1766)
Hipparchia semele (Linnaeus, 1758)
Hyponephele lupinus (O. Costa, 1836)
Hyponephele lycaon (Rottemburg, 1775)
Issoria lathonia (Linnaeus, 1758)
Lasiommata maera (Linnaeus, 1758)
Lasiommata megera (Linnaeus, 1767)
Libythea celtis (Laicharting, 1782)
Limenitis camilla (Linnaeus, 1764)
Limenitis populi (Linnaeus, 1758)
Limenitis reducta Staudinger, 1901
Lopinga achine (Scopoli, 1763)
Maniola jurtina (Linnaeus, 1758)
Melanargia galathea (Linnaeus, 1758)
Melanargia russiae (Esper, 1783)
Melitaea athalia (Rottemburg, 1775)
Melitaea aurelia Nickerl, 1850
Melitaea britomartis Assmann, 1847
Melitaea cinxia (Linnaeus, 1758)
Melitaea diamina (Lang, 1789)
Melitaea didyma (Esper, 1778)
Melitaea phoebe (Denis & Schiffermüller, 1775)
Melitaea telona Fruhstorfer, 1908
Melitaea trivia (Denis & Schiffermüller, 1775)
Minois dryas (Scopoli, 1763)
Neptis rivularis (Scopoli, 1763)
Neptis sappho (Pallas, 1771)
Nymphalis antiopa (Linnaeus, 1758)
Nymphalis polychloros (Linnaeus, 1758)
Nymphalis vaualbum (Denis & Schiffermüller, 1775)
Nymphalis xanthomelas (Esper, 1781)
Pararge aegeria (Linnaeus, 1758)
Polygonia c-album (Linnaeus, 1758)
Pyronia tithonus (Linnaeus, 1767)
Speyeria aglaja (Linnaeus, 1758)
Vanessa atalanta (Linnaeus, 1758)
Vanessa cardui (Linnaeus, 1758)

Papilionidae
Iphiclides podalirius (Linnaeus, 1758)
Papilio machaon Linnaeus, 1758
Parnassius mnemosyne (Linnaeus, 1758)
Zerynthia polyxena (Denis & Schiffermüller, 1775)

Pieridae
Anthocharis cardamines (Linnaeus, 1758)
Aporia crataegi (Linnaeus, 1758)
Colias alfacariensis Ribbe, 1905
Colias chrysotheme (Esper, 1781)
Colias croceus (Fourcroy, 1785)
Colias erate (Esper, 1805)
Colias hyale (Linnaeus, 1758)
Colias myrmidone (Esper, 1781)
Gonepteryx rhamni (Linnaeus, 1758)
Leptidea morsei (Fenton, 1882)
Leptidea reali Reissinger, 1990
Leptidea sinapis (Linnaeus, 1758)
Pieris brassicae (Linnaeus, 1758)
Pieris bryoniae (Hübner, 1806)
Pieris ergane (Geyer, 1828)
Pieris mannii (Mayer, 1851)
Pieris napi (Linnaeus, 1758)
Pieris rapae (Linnaeus, 1758)
Pontia edusa (Fabricius, 1777)

Riodinidae
Hamearis lucina (Linnaeus, 1758)

Moths

Adelidae
Adela croesella (Scopoli, 1763)
Adela cuprella (Denis & Schiffermüller, 1775)
Adela mazzolella (Hübner, 1801)
Adela reaumurella (Linnaeus, 1758)
Adela violella (Denis & Schiffermüller, 1775)
Cauchas fibulella (Denis & Schiffermüller, 1775)
Cauchas leucocerella (Scopoli, 1763)
Cauchas rufifrontella (Treitschke, 1833)
Cauchas rufimitrella (Scopoli, 1763)
Nematopogon adansoniella (Villers, 1789)
Nematopogon metaxella (Hübner, 1813)
Nematopogon pilella (Denis & Schiffermüller, 1775)
Nematopogon robertella (Clerck, 1759)
Nematopogon schwarziellus Zeller, 1839
Nematopogon swammerdamella (Linnaeus, 1758)
Nemophora associatella (Zeller, 1839)
Nemophora cupriacella (Hübner, 1819)
Nemophora degeerella (Linnaeus, 1758)
Nemophora dumerilella (Duponchel, 1839)
Nemophora fasciella (Fabricius, 1775)
Nemophora metallica (Poda, 1761)
Nemophora minimella (Denis & Schiffermüller, 1775)
Nemophora mollella (Hübner, 1813)
Nemophora ochsenheimerella (Hübner, 1813)
Nemophora pfeifferella (Hübner, 1813)
Nemophora prodigellus (Zeller, 1853)
Nemophora raddaella (Hübner, 1793)
Nemophora violellus (Herrich-Schäffer in Stainton, 1851)

Alucitidae
Alucita cymatodactyla Zeller, 1852
Alucita desmodactyla Zeller, 1847
Alucita grammodactyla Zeller, 1841
Alucita hexadactyla Linnaeus, 1758
Alucita huebneri Wallengren, 1859
Pterotopteryx dodecadactyla Hübner, 1813

Argyresthiidae
Argyresthia abdominalis Zeller, 1839
Argyresthia albistria (Haworth, 1828)
Argyresthia bonnetella (Linnaeus, 1758)
Argyresthia brockeella (Hübner, 1813)
Argyresthia conjugella Zeller, 1839
Argyresthia curvella (Linnaeus, 1761)
Argyresthia glaucinella Zeller, 1839
Argyresthia goedartella (Linnaeus, 1758)
Argyresthia ivella (Haworth, 1828)
Argyresthia pruniella (Clerck, 1759)
Argyresthia pygmaeella (Denis & Schiffermüller, 1775)
Argyresthia retinella Zeller, 1839
Argyresthia semifusca (Haworth, 1828)
Argyresthia semitestacella (Curtis, 1833)
Argyresthia sorbiella (Treitschke, 1833)
Argyresthia spinosella Stainton, 1849
Argyresthia arceuthina Zeller, 1839
Argyresthia dilectella Zeller, 1847
Argyresthia laevigatella Herrich-Schäffer, 1855
Argyresthia praecocella Zeller, 1839
Argyresthia thuiella (Packard, 1871)
Argyresthia trifasciata Staudinger, 1871

Autostichidae
Apatema apolausticum Gozmany, 1996
Apatema mediopallidum Walsingham, 1900
Apatema whalleyi (Popescu-Gorj & Capuse, 1965)
Deroxena venosulella (Moschler, 1862)
Donaspastus pannonicus Gozmany, 1952
Holcopogon bubulcellus (Staudinger, 1859)
Oegoconia caradjai Popescu-Gorj & Capuse, 1965
Oegoconia deauratella (Herrich-Schäffer, 1854)
Oegoconia novimundi (Busck, 1915)
Oegoconia uralskella Popescu-Gorj & Capuse, 1965
Pantacordis pales Gozmany, 1954

Batrachedridae
Batrachedra pinicolella (Zeller, 1839)
Batrachedra praeangusta (Haworth, 1828)

Bedelliidae
Bedellia ehikella Szocs, 1967
Bedellia somnulentella (Zeller, 1847)

Blastobasidae
Blastobasis huemeri Sinev, 1993
Blastobasis phycidella (Zeller, 1839)
Hypatopa binotella (Thunberg, 1794)
Hypatopa inunctella Zeller, 1839
Tecmerium perplexum (Gozmany, 1957)

Brachodidae
Brachodes appendiculata (Esper, 1783)
Brachodes pumila (Ochsenheimer, 1808)

Brahmaeidae
Lemonia dumi (Linnaeus, 1761)
Lemonia taraxaci (Denis & Schiffermüller, 1775)

Bucculatricidae
Bucculatrix absinthii Gartner, 1865
Bucculatrix albedinella (Zeller, 1839)
Bucculatrix argentisignella Herrich-Schäffer, 1855
Bucculatrix artemisiella Herrich-Schäffer, 1855
Bucculatrix bechsteinella (Bechstein & Scharfenberg, 1805)
Bucculatrix benacicolella Hartig, 1937
Bucculatrix cantabricella Chretien, 1898
Bucculatrix cidarella (Zeller, 1839)
Bucculatrix cristatella (Zeller, 1839)
Bucculatrix demaryella (Duponchel, 1840)
Bucculatrix frangutella (Goeze, 1783)
Bucculatrix gnaphaliella (Treitschke, 1833)
Bucculatrix herbalbella Chretien, 1915
Bucculatrix maritima Stainton, 1851
Bucculatrix nigricomella (Zeller, 1839)
Bucculatrix noltei Petry, 1912
Bucculatrix pannonica Deschka, 1982
Bucculatrix ratisbonensis Stainton, 1861
Bucculatrix thoracella (Thunberg, 1794)
Bucculatrix ulmella Zeller, 1848
Bucculatrix ulmifoliae M. Hering, 1931

Carposinidae
Carposina berberidella Herrich-Schäffer, 1854
Carposina scirrhosella Herrich-Schäffer, 1854

Chimabachidae
Dasystoma salicella (Hübner, 1796)
Diurnea fagella (Denis & Schiffermüller, 1775)
Diurnea lipsiella (Denis & Schiffermüller, 1775)

Choreutidae
Anthophila fabriciana (Linnaeus, 1767)
Choreutis nemorana (Hübner, 1799)
Choreutis pariana (Clerck, 1759)
Prochoreutis myllerana (Fabricius, 1794)
Prochoreutis sehestediana (Fabricius, 1776)
Prochoreutis stellaris (Zeller, 1847)
Tebenna bjerkandrella (Thunberg, 1784)
Tebenna micalis (Mann, 1857)

Coleophoridae
Augasma aeratella (Zeller, 1839)
Coleophora absinthii Wocke, 1877
Coleophora acrisella Milliere, 1872
Coleophora adelogrammella Zeller, 1849
Coleophora adjunctella Hodgkinson, 1882
Coleophora adspersella Benander, 1939
Coleophora ahenella Heinemann, 1877
Coleophora albella (Thunberg, 1788)
Coleophora albicans Zeller, 1849
Coleophora albicostella (Duponchel, 1842)
Coleophora albidella (Denis & Schiffermüller, 1775)
Coleophora albilineella Toll, 1960
Coleophora albitarsella Zeller, 1849
Coleophora alcyonipennella (Kollar, 1832)
Coleophora alticolella Zeller, 1849
Coleophora amellivora Baldizzone, 1979
Coleophora anatipenella (Hübner, 1796)
Coleophora antennariella Herrich-Schäffer, 1861
Coleophora argentula (Stephens, 1834)
Coleophora artemisicolella Bruand, 1855
Coleophora asteris Muhlig, 1864
Coleophora astragalella Zeller, 1849
Coleophora atriplicis Meyrick, 1928
Coleophora auricella (Fabricius, 1794)
Coleophora badiipennella (Duponchel, 1843)
Coleophora ballotella (Fischer v. Röslerstamm, 1839)
Coleophora betulella Heinemann, 1877
Coleophora bilineatella Zeller, 1849
Coleophora bilineella Herrich-Schäffer, 1855
Coleophora binderella (Kollar, 1832)
Coleophora binotapennella (Duponchel, 1843)
Coleophora brevipalpella Wocke, 1874
Coleophora caelebipennella Zeller, 1839
Coleophora caespititiella Zeller, 1839
Coleophora calycotomella Stainton, 1869
Coleophora cartilaginella Christoph, 1872
Coleophora cecidophorella Oudejans, 1972
Coleophora chalcogrammella Zeller, 1839
Coleophora chamaedriella Bruand, 1852
Coleophora chrysanthemi Hofmann, 1869
Coleophora ciconiella Herrich-Schäffer, 1855
Coleophora clypeiferella Hofmann, 1871
Coleophora colutella (Fabricius, 1794)
Coleophora congeriella Staudinger, 1859
Coleophora conspicuella Zeller, 1849
Coleophora conyzae Zeller, 1868
Coleophora coracipennella (Hübner, 1796)
Coleophora cornutella Herrich-Schäffer, 1861
Coleophora coronillae Zeller, 1849
Coleophora corsicella Walsingham, 1898
Coleophora cracella (Vallot, 1835)
Coleophora currucipennella Zeller, 1839
Coleophora deauratella Lienig & Zeller, 1846
Coleophora dentiferella Toll, 1952
Coleophora dianthi Herrich-Schäffer, 1855
Coleophora directella Zeller, 1849
Coleophora discordella Zeller, 1849
Coleophora ditella Zeller, 1849
Coleophora eupepla Gozmany, 1954
Coleophora eurasiatica Baldizzone, 1989
Coleophora flaviella Mann, 1857
Coleophora flavipennella (Duponchel, 1843)
Coleophora follicularis (Vallot, 1802)
Coleophora frankii Schmidt, 1886
Coleophora fringillella Zeller, 1839
Coleophora frischella (Linnaeus, 1758)
Coleophora fuscociliella Zeller, 1849
Coleophora fuscocuprella Herrich-Schäffer, 1855
Coleophora galatellae Hering, 1942
Coleophora galbulipennella Zeller, 1838
Coleophora gallipennella (Hübner, 1796)
Coleophora genistae Stainton, 1857
Coleophora glaseri Toll, 1961
Coleophora glaucicolella Wood, 1892
Coleophora gnaphalii Zeller, 1839
Coleophora graminicolella Heinemann, 1876
Coleophora granulatella Zeller, 1849
Coleophora gryphipennella (Hübner, 1796)
Coleophora halophilella Zimmermann, 1926
Coleophora hartigi Toll, 1944
Coleophora hemerobiella (Scopoli, 1763)
Coleophora hungariae Gozmany, 1955
Coleophora hydrolapathella Hering, 1921
Coleophora ibipennella Zeller, 1849
Coleophora impalella Toll, 1961
Coleophora inulae Wocke, 1877
Coleophora juncicolella Stainton, 1851
Coleophora kasyi Toll, 1961
Coleophora klimeschiella Toll, 1952
Coleophora kroneella Fuchs, 1899
Coleophora kuehnella (Goeze, 1783)
Coleophora kyffhusana Petry, 1898
Coleophora laricella (Hübner, 1817)
Coleophora lessinica Baldizzone, 1980
Coleophora limosipennella (Duponchel, 1843)
Coleophora lineolea (Haworth, 1828)
Coleophora linosyridella Fuchs, 1880
Coleophora linosyris Hering, 1937
Coleophora lithargyrinella Zeller, 1849
Coleophora lixella Zeller, 1849
Coleophora longicornella Constant, 1893
Coleophora lusciniaepennella (Treitschke, 1833)
Coleophora lutipennella (Zeller, 1838)
Coleophora magyarica Baldizzone, 1983
Coleophora mayrella (Hübner, 1813)
Coleophora medelichensis Krone, 1908
Coleophora millefolii Zeller, 1849
Coleophora milvipennis Zeller, 1839
Coleophora motacillella Zeller, 1849
Coleophora musculella Muhlig, 1864
Coleophora narbonensis Baldizzone, 1990
Coleophora niveiciliella Hofmann, 1877
Coleophora niveicostella Zeller, 1839
Coleophora niveistrigella Wocke, 1877
Coleophora nomgona Falkovitsh, 1975
Coleophora nutantella Muhlig & Frey, 1857
Coleophora obtectella Zeller, 1849
Coleophora obviella Rebel, 1914
Coleophora ochrea (Haworth, 1828)
Coleophora ochripennella Zeller, 1849
Coleophora odorariella Muhlig, 1857
Coleophora onobrychiella Zeller, 1849
Coleophora ononidella Milliere, 1879
Coleophora onopordiella Zeller, 1849
Coleophora orbitella Zeller, 1849
Coleophora oriolella Zeller, 1849
Coleophora ornatipennella (Hübner, 1796)
Coleophora otidipennella (Hübner, 1817)
Coleophora paripennella Zeller, 1839
Coleophora partitella Zeller, 1849
Coleophora peisoniella Kasy, 1965
Coleophora pennella (Denis & Schiffermüller, 1775)
Coleophora peribenanderi Toll, 1943
Coleophora pratella Zeller, 1871
Coleophora preisseckeri Toll, 1942
Coleophora prunifoliae Doets, 1944
Coleophora pseudociconiella Toll, 1952
Coleophora pseudoditella Baldizzone & Patzak, 1983
Coleophora pseudolinosyris Kasy, 1979
Coleophora pseudorepentis Toll, 1960
Coleophora ptarmicia Walsingham, 1910
Coleophora pulmonariella Ragonot, 1874
Coleophora punctulatella Zeller, 1849
Coleophora pyrrhulipennella Zeller, 1839
Coleophora ramosella Zeller, 1849
Coleophora remizella Baldizzone, 1983
Coleophora riffelensis Rebel, 1913
Coleophora salicorniae Heinemann & Wocke, 1877
Coleophora salinella Stainton, 1859
Coleophora saponariella Heeger, 1848
Coleophora saturatella Stainton, 1850
Coleophora saxicolella (Duponchel, 1843)
Coleophora sergiella Falkovitsh, 1979
Coleophora serpylletorum Hering, 1889
Coleophora serratella (Linnaeus, 1761)
Coleophora serratulella Herrich-Schäffer, 1855
Coleophora siccifolia Stainton, 1856
Coleophora silenella Herrich-Schäffer, 1855
Coleophora solitariella Zeller, 1849
Coleophora spiraeella Rebel, 1916
Coleophora squalorella Zeller, 1849
Coleophora squamosella Stainton, 1856
Coleophora sternipennella (Zetterstedt, 1839)
Coleophora stramentella Zeller, 1849
Coleophora striatipennella Nylander in Tengstrom, 1848
Coleophora striolatella Zeller, 1849
Coleophora subula (Falkovitsh, 1993)
Coleophora succursella Herrich-Schäffer, 1855
Coleophora sylvaticella Wood, 1892
Coleophora taeniipennella Herrich-Schäffer, 1855
Coleophora tamesis Waters, 1929
Coleophora tanaceti Muhlig, 1865
Coleophora therinella Tengstrom, 1848
Coleophora thymi Hering, 1942
Coleophora trientella Christoph, 1872
Coleophora trifariella Zeller, 1849
Coleophora trifolii (Curtis, 1832)
Coleophora trigeminella Fuchs, 1881
Coleophora trochilella (Duponchel, 1843)
Coleophora tyrrhaenica Amsel, 1951
Coleophora unipunctella Zeller, 1849
Coleophora uralensis Toll, 1961
Coleophora versurella Zeller, 1849
Coleophora vestianella (Linnaeus, 1758)
Coleophora vibicella (Hübner, 1813)
Coleophora vibicigerella Zeller, 1839
Coleophora vicinella Zeller, 1849
Coleophora violacea (Strom, 1783)
Coleophora virgatella Zeller, 1849
Coleophora virgaureae Stainton, 1857
Coleophora vulnerariae Zeller, 1839
Coleophora vulpecula Zeller, 1849
Coleophora wockeella Zeller, 1849
Coleophora zelleriella Heinemann, 1854
Goniodoma auroguttella (Fischer v. Röslerstamm, 1841)
Metriotes lutarea (Haworth, 1828)

Cosmopterigidae
Ascalenia vanella (Frey, 1860)
Cosmopterix lienigiella Zeller, 1846
Cosmopterix orichalcea Stainton, 1861
Cosmopterix scribaiella Zeller, 1850
Cosmopterix zieglerella (Hübner, 1810)
Eteobalea albiapicella (Duponchel, 1843)
Eteobalea anonymella (Riedl, 1965)
Eteobalea intermediella (Riedl, 1966)
Eteobalea serratella (Treitschke, 1833)
Eteobalea tririvella (Staudinger, 1870)
Hodgesiella rebeli (Krone, 1905)
Isidiella nickerlii (Nickerl, 1864)
Limnaecia phragmitella Stainton, 1851
Pancalia leuwenhoekella (Linnaeus, 1761)
Pancalia schwarzella (Fabricius, 1798)
Pyroderces argyrogrammos (Zeller, 1847)
Pyroderces klimeschi Rebel, 1938
Sorhagenia janiszewskae Riedl, 1962
Sorhagenia lophyrella (Douglas, 1846)
Sorhagenia rhamniella (Zeller, 1839)
Stagmatophora heydeniella (Fischer von Röslerstamm, 1838)
Vulcaniella extremella (Wocke, 1871)
Vulcaniella pomposella (Zeller, 1839)

Cossidae
Acossus terebra (Denis & Schiffermüller, 1775)
Cossus cossus (Linnaeus, 1758)
Dyspessa ulula (Borkhausen, 1790)
Paracossulus thrips (Hübner, 1818)
Parahypopta caestrum (Hübner, 1808)
Phragmataecia castaneae (Hübner, 1790)
Zeuzera pyrina (Linnaeus, 1761)

Crambidae
Acentria ephemerella (Denis & Schiffermüller, 1775)
Achyra nudalis (Hübner, 1796)
Agriphila brioniellus (Zerny, 1914)
Agriphila deliella (Hübner, 1813)
Agriphila geniculea (Haworth, 1811)
Agriphila hungaricus (A. Schmidt, 1909)
Agriphila inquinatella (Denis & Schiffermüller, 1775)
Agriphila poliellus (Treitschke, 1832)
Agriphila selasella (Hübner, 1813)
Agriphila straminella (Denis & Schiffermüller, 1775)
Agriphila tolli (Błeszyński, 1952)
Agriphila tristella (Denis & Schiffermüller, 1775)
Agrotera nemoralis (Scopoli, 1763)
Anania coronata (Hufnagel, 1767)
Anania crocealis (Hübner, 1796)
Anania funebris (Strom, 1768)
Anania fuscalis (Denis & Schiffermüller, 1775)
Anania hortulata (Linnaeus, 1758)
Anania lancealis (Denis & Schiffermüller, 1775)
Anania luctualis (Hübner, 1793)
Anania perlucidalis (Hübner, 1809)
Anania stachydalis (Germar, 1821)
Anania terrealis (Treitschke, 1829)
Anania testacealis (Zeller, 1847)
Anania verbascalis (Denis & Schiffermüller, 1775)
Ancylolomia palpella (Denis & Schiffermüller, 1775)
Ancylolomia pectinatellus (Zeller, 1847)
Antigastra catalaunalis (Duponchel, 1833)
Aporodes floralis (Hübner, 1809)
Atralata albofascialis (Treitschke, 1829)
Calamotropha aureliellus (Fischer v. Röslerstamm, 1841)
Calamotropha paludella (Hübner, 1824)
Cataclysta lemnata (Linnaeus, 1758)
Catoptria confusellus (Staudinger, 1882)
Catoptria falsella (Denis & Schiffermüller, 1775)
Catoptria fulgidella (Hübner, 1813)
Catoptria lythargyrella (Hübner, 1796)
Catoptria margaritella (Denis & Schiffermüller, 1775)
Catoptria myella (Hübner, 1796)
Catoptria mytilella (Hübner, 1805)
Catoptria osthelderi (Lattin, 1950)
Catoptria permutatellus (Herrich-Schäffer, 1848)
Catoptria pinella (Linnaeus, 1758)
Catoptria verellus (Zincken, 1817)
Chilo luteellus (Motschulsky, 1866)
Chilo phragmitella (Hübner, 1805)
Chilo suppressalis (Walker, 1863)
Cholius luteolaris (Scopoli, 1772)
Chrysocrambus craterella (Scopoli, 1763)
Chrysocrambus linetella (Fabricius, 1781)
Chrysoteuchia culmella (Linnaeus, 1758)
Crambus ericella (Hübner, 1813)
Crambus hamella (Thunberg, 1788)
Crambus lathoniellus (Zincken, 1817)
Crambus pascuella (Linnaeus, 1758)
Crambus perlella (Scopoli, 1763)
Crambus pratella (Linnaeus, 1758)
Crambus silvella (Hübner, 1813)
Crambus uliginosellus Zeller, 1850
Cynaeda dentalis (Denis & Schiffermüller, 1775)
Cynaeda gigantea (Wocke, 1871)
Diasemia reticularis (Linnaeus, 1761)
Dolicharthria punctalis (Denis & Schiffermüller, 1775)
Dolicharthria stigmosalis (Herrich-Schäffer, 1848)
Donacaula forficella (Thunberg, 1794)
Donacaula mucronella (Denis & Schiffermüller, 1775)
Duponchelia fovealis Zeller, 1847
Ecpyrrhorrhoe diffusalis (Guenee, 1854)
Ecpyrrhorrhoe rubiginalis (Hübner, 1796)
Elophila nymphaeata (Linnaeus, 1758)
Elophila rivulalis (Duponchel, 1834)
Epascestria pustulalis (Hübner, 1823)
Euchromius bella (Hübner, 1796)
Euchromius ocellea (Haworth, 1811)
Eudonia lacustrata (Panzer, 1804)
Eudonia laetella (Zeller, 1846)
Eudonia mercurella (Linnaeus, 1758)
Eudonia murana (Curtis, 1827)
Eudonia pallida (Curtis, 1827)
Eudonia truncicolella (Stainton, 1849)
Eudonia vallesialis (Duponchel, 1832)
Eurrhypis pollinalis (Denis & Schiffermüller, 1775)
Evergestis aenealis (Denis & Schiffermüller, 1775)
Evergestis alborivulalis (Eversmann, 1844)
Evergestis extimalis (Scopoli, 1763)
Evergestis forficalis (Linnaeus, 1758)
Evergestis frumentalis (Linnaeus, 1761)
Evergestis limbata (Linnaeus, 1767)
Evergestis pallidata (Hufnagel, 1767)
Evergestis politalis (Denis & Schiffermüller, 1775)
Friedlanderia cicatricella (Hübner, 1824)
Gesneria centuriella (Denis & Schiffermüller, 1775)
Heliothela wulfeniana (Scopoli, 1763)
Hellula undalis (Fabricius, 1781)
Hyperlais dulcinalis (Treitschke, 1835)
Loxostege aeruginalis (Hübner, 1796)
Loxostege deliblatica Szent-Ivany & Uhrik-Meszaros, 1942
Loxostege fascialis (Hübner, 1796)
Loxostege manualis (Geyer, 1832)
Loxostege sticticalis (Linnaeus, 1761)
Loxostege turbidalis (Treitschke, 1829)
Mecyna flavalis (Denis & Schiffermüller, 1775)
Mecyna lutealis (Duponchel, 1833)
Mecyna trinalis (Denis & Schiffermüller, 1775)
Mesocrambus candiellus (Herrich-Schäffer, 1848)
Metacrambus carectellus (Zeller, 1847)
Metasia ophialis (Treitschke, 1829)
Metaxmeste phrygialis (Hübner, 1796)
Nascia cilialis (Hübner, 1796)
Nomophila noctuella (Denis & Schiffermüller, 1775)
Nymphula nitidulata (Hufnagel, 1767)
Ostrinia nubilalis (Hübner, 1796)
Ostrinia palustralis (Hübner, 1796)
Ostrinia quadripunctalis (Denis & Schiffermüller, 1775)
Palpita vitrealis (Rossi, 1794)
Paracorsia repandalis (Denis & Schiffermüller, 1775)
Parapoynx nivalis (Denis & Schiffermüller, 1775)
Parapoynx stratiotata (Linnaeus, 1758)
Paratalanta hyalinalis (Hübner, 1796)
Paratalanta pandalis (Hübner, 1825)
Pediasia aridella (Thunberg, 1788)
Pediasia contaminella (Hübner, 1796)
Pediasia fascelinella (Hübner, 1813)
Pediasia jucundellus (Herrich-Schäffer, 1847)
Pediasia luteella (Denis & Schiffermüller, 1775)
Pediasia matricella (Treitschke, 1832)
Platytes alpinella (Hübner, 1813)
Platytes cerussella (Denis & Schiffermüller, 1775)
Pleuroptya balteata (Fabricius, 1798)
Pleuroptya ruralis (Scopoli, 1763)
Psammotis pulveralis (Hübner, 1796)
Pyrausta aurata (Scopoli, 1763)
Pyrausta castalis Treitschke, 1829
Pyrausta cingulata (Linnaeus, 1758)
Pyrausta coracinalis Leraut, 1982
Pyrausta despicata (Scopoli, 1763)
Pyrausta falcatalis Guenee, 1854
Pyrausta nigrata (Scopoli, 1763)
Pyrausta obfuscata (Scopoli, 1763)
Pyrausta ostrinalis (Hübner, 1796)
Pyrausta porphyralis (Denis & Schiffermüller, 1775)
Pyrausta purpuralis (Linnaeus, 1758)
Pyrausta sanguinalis (Linnaeus, 1767)
Pyrausta virginalis Duponchel, 1832
Schoenobius gigantella (Denis & Schiffermüller, 1775)
Scirpophaga praelata (Scopoli, 1763)
Sclerocona acutella (Eversmann, 1842)
Scoparia ambigualis (Treitschke, 1829)
Scoparia ancipitella (La Harpe, 1855)
Scoparia basistrigalis Knaggs, 1866
Scoparia conicella (La Harpe, 1863)
Scoparia ingratella (Zeller, 1846)
Scoparia pyralella (Denis & Schiffermüller, 1775)
Scoparia subfusca Haworth, 1811
Sitochroa palealis (Denis & Schiffermüller, 1775)
Sitochroa verticalis (Linnaeus, 1758)
Talis quercella (Denis & Schiffermüller, 1775)
Thisanotia chrysonuchella (Scopoli, 1763)
Titanio normalis (Hübner, 1796)
Udea accolalis (Zeller, 1867)
Udea ferrugalis (Hübner, 1796)
Udea fulvalis (Hübner, 1809)
Udea inquinatalis (Lienig & Zeller, 1846)
Udea lutealis (Hübner, 1809)
Udea olivalis (Denis & Schiffermüller, 1775)
Udea prunalis (Denis & Schiffermüller, 1775)
Uresiphita gilvata (Fabricius, 1794)
Xanthocrambus lucellus (Herrich-Schäffer, 1848)
Xanthocrambus saxonellus (Zincken, 1821)

Douglasiidae
Klimeschia transversella (Zeller, 1839)
Tinagma balteolella (Fischer von Röslerstamm, 1841)
Tinagma ocnerostomella (Stainton, 1850)
Tinagma perdicella Zeller, 1839

Drepanidae
Achlya flavicornis (Linnaeus, 1758)
Asphalia ruficollis (Denis & Schiffermüller, 1775)
Cilix glaucata (Scopoli, 1763)
Cymatophorina diluta (Denis & Schiffermüller, 1775)
Drepana curvatula (Borkhausen, 1790)
Drepana falcataria (Linnaeus, 1758)
Falcaria lacertinaria (Linnaeus, 1758)
Habrosyne pyritoides (Hufnagel, 1766)
Ochropacha duplaris (Linnaeus, 1761)
Polyploca ridens (Fabricius, 1787)
Sabra harpagula (Esper, 1786)
Tethea ocularis (Linnaeus, 1767)
Tethea or (Denis & Schiffermüller, 1775)
Tetheella fluctuosa (Hübner, 1803)
Thyatira batis (Linnaeus, 1758)
Watsonalla binaria (Hufnagel, 1767)
Watsonalla cultraria (Fabricius, 1775)

Elachistidae
Agonopterix adspersella (Kollar, 1832)
Agonopterix alstromeriana (Clerck, 1759)
Agonopterix angelicella (Hübner, 1813)
Agonopterix arenella (Denis & Schiffermüller, 1775)
Agonopterix assimilella (Treitschke, 1832)
Agonopterix astrantiae (Heinemann, 1870)
Agonopterix atomella (Denis & Schiffermüller, 1775)
Agonopterix capreolella (Zeller, 1839)
Agonopterix carduella (Hübner, 1817)
Agonopterix ciliella (Stainton, 1849)
Agonopterix cnicella (Treitschke, 1832)
Agonopterix conterminella (Zeller, 1839)
Agonopterix curvipunctosa (Haworth, 1811)
Agonopterix doronicella (Wocke, 1849)
Agonopterix furvella (Treitschke, 1832)
Agonopterix heracliana (Linnaeus, 1758)
Agonopterix hippomarathri (Nickerl, 1864)
Agonopterix kaekeritziana (Linnaeus, 1767)
Agonopterix laterella (Denis & Schiffermüller, 1775)
Agonopterix liturosa (Haworth, 1811)
Agonopterix nanatella (Stainton, 1849)
Agonopterix nervosa (Haworth, 1811)
Agonopterix ocellana (Fabricius, 1775)
Agonopterix oinochroa (Turati, 1879)
Agonopterix pallorella (Zeller, 1839)
Agonopterix parilella (Treitschke, 1835)
Agonopterix petasitis (Standfuss, 1851)
Agonopterix propinquella (Treitschke, 1835)
Agonopterix purpurea (Haworth, 1811)
Agonopterix putridella (Denis & Schiffermüller, 1775)
Agonopterix rotundella (Douglas, 1846)
Agonopterix selini (Heinemann, 1870)
Agonopterix senecionis (Nickerl, 1864)
Agonopterix subpropinquella (Stainton, 1849)
Agonopterix thapsiella (Zeller, 1847)
Agonopterix yeatiana (Fabricius, 1781)
Anchinia cristalis (Scopoli, 1763)
Anchinia daphnella (Denis & Schiffermüller, 1775)
Anchinia laureolella Herrich-Schäffer, 1854
Blastodacna atra (Haworth, 1828)
Blastodacna hellerella (Duponchel, 1838)
Chrysoclista linneella (Clerck, 1759)
Chrysoclista splendida Karsholt, 1997
Depressaria absynthiella Herrich-Schäffer, 1865
Depressaria albipunctella (Denis & Schiffermüller, 1775)
Depressaria artemisiae Nickerl, 1864
Depressaria badiella (Hübner, 1796)
Depressaria cervicella Herrich-Schäffer, 1854
Depressaria chaerophylli Zeller, 1839
Depressaria corticinella Zeller, 1854
Depressaria daucella (Denis & Schiffermüller, 1775)
Depressaria depressana (Fabricius, 1775)
Depressaria douglasella Stainton, 1849
Depressaria emeritella Stainton, 1849
Depressaria marcella Rebel, 1901
Depressaria olerella Zeller, 1854
Depressaria pimpinellae Zeller, 1839
Depressaria pulcherrimella Stainton, 1849
Depressaria radiella (Goeze, 1783)
Depressaria ultimella Stainton, 1849
Depressaria dictamnella (Treitschke, 1835)
Dystebenna stephensi (Stainton, 1849)
Elachista argentella (Clerck, 1759)
Elachista bedellella (Sircom, 1848)
Elachista bisulcella (Duponchel, 1843)
Elachista cingillella (Herrich-Schäffer, 1855)
Elachista collitella (Duponchel, 1843)
Elachista disemiella Zeller, 1847
Elachista dispilella Zeller, 1839
Elachista dispunctella (Duponchel, 1843)
Elachista fasciola Parenti, 1983
Elachista festucicolella Zeller, 1859
Elachista gangabella Zeller, 1850
Elachista gormella Nielsen & Traugott-Olsen, 1987
Elachista hedemanni Rebel, 1899
Elachista heringi Rebel, 1899
Elachista klimeschiella Parenti, 2002
Elachista manni Traugott-Olsen, 1990
Elachista metella Kaila, 2002
Elachista nitidulella (Herrich-Schäffer, 1885)
Elachista obliquella Stainton, 1854
Elachista pollinariella Zeller, 1839
Elachista pollutella Duponchel, 1843
Elachista pullicomella Zeller, 1839
Elachista revinctella Zeller, 1850
Elachista rudectella Stainton, 1851
Elachista spumella Caradja, 1920
Elachista squamosella (Duponchel, 1843)
Elachista subalbidella Schlager, 1847
Elachista subocellea (Stephens, 1834)
Elachista svenssoni Traugott-Olsen, 1988
Elachista szocsi Parenti, 1978
Elachista triatomea (Haworth, 1828)
Elachista triseriatella Stainton, 1854
Elachista unifasciella (Haworth, 1828)
Elachista kalki Parenti, 1978
Elachista albidella Nylander, 1848
Elachista albifrontella (Hübner, 1817)
Elachista alpinella Stainton, 1854
Elachista anserinella Zeller, 1839
Elachista apicipunctella Stainton, 1849
Elachista atricomella Stainton, 1849
Elachista biatomella (Stainton, 1848)
Elachista canapennella (Hübner, 1813)
Elachista contaminatella Zeller, 1847
Elachista diederichsiella E. Hering, 1889
Elachista elegans Frey, 1859
Elachista freyerella (Hübner, 1825)
Elachista gleichenella (Fabricius, 1781)
Elachista griseella (Duponchel, 1843)
Elachista herrichii Frey, 1859
Elachista humilis Zeller, 1850
Elachista juliensis Frey, 1870
Elachista kilmunella Stainton, 1849
Elachista luticomella Zeller, 1839
Elachista maculicerusella (Bruand, 1859)
Elachista martinii O. Hofmann, 1898
Elachista morandinii Huemer & Kaila, 2003
Elachista poae Stainton, 1855
Elachista pomerana Frey, 1870
Elachista quadripunctella (Hübner, 1825)
Elachista rufocinerea (Haworth, 1828)
Elachista scirpi Stainton, 1887
Elachista serricornis Stainton, 1854
Elachista stabilella Stainton, 1858
Elachista subnigrella Douglas, 1853
Elachista utonella Frey, 1856
Ethmia bipunctella (Fabricius, 1775)
Ethmia candidella (Alphéraky, 1908)
Ethmia dodecea (Haworth, 1828)
Ethmia fumidella (Wocke, 1850)
Ethmia haemorrhoidella (Eversmann, 1844)
Ethmia iranella Zerny, 1940
Ethmia pusiella (Linnaeus, 1758)
Ethmia quadrillella (Goeze, 1783)
Ethmia terminella T. B. Fletcher, 1938
Exaeretia culcitella (Herrich-Schäffer, 1854)
Exaeretia preisseckeri (Rebel, 1937)
Haplochrois albanica (Rebel & Zerny, 1932)
Haplochrois ochraceella (Rebel, 1903)
Heinemannia festivella (Denis & Schiffermüller, 1775)
Heinemannia laspeyrella (Hübner, 1796)
Hypercallia citrinalis (Scopoli, 1763)
Luquetia lobella (Denis & Schiffermüller, 1775)
Orophia denisella (Denis & Schiffermüller, 1775)
Orophia ferrugella (Denis & Schiffermüller, 1775)
Orophia sordidella (Hübner, 1796)
Perittia farinella (Thunberg, 1794)
Perittia herrichiella (Herrich-Schäffer, 1855)
Perittia huemeri (Traugott-Olsen, 1990)
Semioscopis avellanella (Hübner, 1793)
Semioscopis oculella (Thunberg, 1794)
Semioscopis steinkellneriana (Denis & Schiffermüller, 1775)
Semioscopis strigulana (Denis & Schiffermüller, 1775)
Spuleria flavicaput (Haworth, 1828)
Stephensia brunnichella (Linnaeus, 1767)
Telechrysis tripuncta (Haworth, 1828)

Endromidae
Endromis versicolora (Linnaeus, 1758)

Epermeniidae
Epermenia aequidentellus (E. Hofmann, 1867)
Epermenia chaerophyllella (Goeze, 1783)
Epermenia illigerella (Hübner, 1813)
Epermenia insecurella (Stainton, 1854)
Epermenia petrusellus (Heylaerts, 1883)
Epermenia strictellus (Wocke, 1867)
Epermenia pontificella (Hübner, 1796)
Ochromolopis ictella (Hübner, 1813)

Erebidae
Amata phegea (Linnaeus, 1758)
Arctia caja (Linnaeus, 1758)
Arctia festiva (Hufnagel, 1766)
Arctia villica (Linnaeus, 1758)
Arctornis l-nigrum (Muller, 1764)
Arytrura musculus (Menetries, 1859)
Atolmis rubricollis (Linnaeus, 1758)
Callimorpha dominula (Linnaeus, 1758)
Calliteara abietis (Denis & Schiffermüller, 1775)
Calliteara pudibunda (Linnaeus, 1758)
Calymma communimacula (Denis & Schiffermüller, 1775)
Calyptra thalictri (Borkhausen, 1790)
Catephia alchymista (Denis & Schiffermüller, 1775)
Catocala conversa (Esper, 1783)
Catocala dilecta (Hübner, 1808)
Catocala diversa (Geyer, 1828)
Catocala electa (Vieweg, 1790)
Catocala elocata (Esper, 1787)
Catocala fraxini (Linnaeus, 1758)
Catocala fulminea (Scopoli, 1763)
Catocala hymenaea (Denis & Schiffermüller, 1775)
Catocala nupta (Linnaeus, 1767)
Catocala nymphagoga (Esper, 1787)
Catocala promissa (Denis & Schiffermüller, 1775)
Catocala puerpera (Giorna, 1791)
Catocala sponsa (Linnaeus, 1767)
Chelis maculosa (Gerning, 1780)
Colobochyla salicalis (Denis & Schiffermüller, 1775)
Coscinia cribraria (Linnaeus, 1758)
Coscinia striata (Linnaeus, 1758)
Cybosia mesomella (Linnaeus, 1758)
Diacrisia sannio (Linnaeus, 1758)
Diaphora luctuosa (Hübner, 1831)
Diaphora mendica (Clerck, 1759)
Dicallomera fascelina (Linnaeus, 1758)
Dysauxes ancilla (Linnaeus, 1767)
Dysgonia algira (Linnaeus, 1767)
Eilema caniola (Hübner, 1808)
Eilema complana (Linnaeus, 1758)
Eilema depressa (Esper, 1787)
Eilema griseola (Hübner, 1803)
Eilema lurideola (Zincken, 1817)
Eilema lutarella (Linnaeus, 1758)
Eilema palliatella (Scopoli, 1763)
Eilema pseudocomplana (Daniel, 1939)
Eilema pygmaeola (Doubleday, 1847)
Eilema sororcula (Hufnagel, 1766)
Eublemma amoena (Hübner, 1803)
Eublemma minutata (Fabricius, 1794)
Eublemma ostrina (Hübner, 1808)
Eublemma panonica (Freyer, 1840)
Eublemma parva (Hübner, 1808)
Eublemma purpurina (Denis & Schiffermüller, 1775)
Eublemma rosea (Hübner, 1790)
Euclidia mi (Clerck, 1759)
Euclidia glyphica (Linnaeus, 1758)
Euclidia triquetra (Denis & Schiffermüller, 1775)
Euplagia quadripunctaria (Poda, 1761)
Euproctis chrysorrhoea (Linnaeus, 1758)
Euproctis similis (Fuessly, 1775)
Grammodes bifasciata (Petagna, 1787)
Grammodes stolida (Fabricius, 1775)
Herminia grisealis (Denis & Schiffermüller, 1775)
Herminia tarsicrinalis (Knoch, 1782)
Herminia tarsipennalis (Treitschke, 1835)
Herminia tenuialis (Rebel, 1899)
Hypena crassalis (Fabricius, 1787)
Hypena obesalis Treitschke, 1829
Hypena proboscidalis (Linnaeus, 1758)
Hypena rostralis (Linnaeus, 1758)
Hypenodes humidalis Doubleday, 1850
Hypenodes pannonica Fibiger, Pekarsky & Ronkay, 2010
Hyphantria cunea (Drury, 1773)
Hyphoraia aulica (Linnaeus, 1758)
Idia calvaria (Denis & Schiffermüller, 1775)
Laelia coenosa (Hübner, 1808)
Laspeyria flexula (Denis & Schiffermüller, 1775)
Leucoma salicis (Linnaeus, 1758)
Lithosia quadra (Linnaeus, 1758)
Lygephila craccae (Denis & Schiffermüller, 1775)
Lygephila ludicra (Hübner, 1790)
Lygephila lusoria (Linnaeus, 1758)
Lygephila pastinum (Treitschke, 1826)
Lygephila procax (Hübner, 1813)
Lygephila viciae (Hübner, 1822)
Lymantria dispar (Linnaeus, 1758)
Lymantria monacha (Linnaeus, 1758)
Macrochilo cribrumalis (Hübner, 1793)
Metachrostis dardouini (Boisduval, 1840)
Miltochrista miniata (Forster, 1771)
Minucia lunaris (Denis & Schiffermüller, 1775)
Nudaria mundana (Linnaeus, 1761)
Ocneria rubea (Denis & Schiffermüller, 1775)
Ocnogyna parasita (Hübner, 1790)
Odice arcuinna (Hübner, 1790)
Orectis proboscidata (Herrich-Schäffer, 1851)
Orgyia antiquoides (Hübner, 1822)
Orgyia recens (Hübner, 1819)
Orgyia antiqua (Linnaeus, 1758)
Paidia rica (Freyer, 1858)
Paracolax tristalis (Fabricius, 1794)
Parascotia fuliginaria (Linnaeus, 1761)
Parasemia plantaginis (Linnaeus, 1758)
Pechipogo strigilata (Linnaeus, 1758)
Pelosia muscerda (Hufnagel, 1766)
Pelosia obtusa (Herrich-Schäffer, 1852)
Penthophera morio (Linnaeus, 1767)
Pericallia matronula (Linnaeus, 1758)
Phragmatobia fuliginosa (Linnaeus, 1758)
Phragmatobia luctifera (Denis & Schiffermüller, 1775)
Phytometra viridaria (Clerck, 1759)
Polypogon gryphalis (Herrich-Schäffer, 1851)
Polypogon tentacularia (Linnaeus, 1758)
Rhyparia purpurata (Linnaeus, 1758)
Rhyparioides metelkana (Lederer, 1861)
Rivula sericealis (Scopoli, 1763)
Schrankia costaestrigalis (Stephens, 1834)
Schrankia taenialis (Hübner, 1809)
Scoliopteryx libatrix (Linnaeus, 1758)
Setina irrorella (Linnaeus, 1758)
Setina roscida (Denis & Schiffermüller, 1775)
Simplicia rectalis (Eversmann, 1842)
Spilosoma lubricipeda (Linnaeus, 1758)
Spilosoma lutea (Hufnagel, 1766)
Spilosoma urticae (Esper, 1789)
Thumatha senex (Hübner, 1808)
Trisateles emortualis (Denis & Schiffermüller, 1775)
Tyria jacobaeae (Linnaeus, 1758)
Utetheisa pulchella (Linnaeus, 1758)
Watsonarctia deserta (Bartel, 1902)
Zanclognatha lunalis (Scopoli, 1763)
Zanclognatha zelleralis (Wocke, 1850)

Eriocraniidae
Dyseriocrania subpurpurella (Haworth, 1828)
Eriocrania semipurpurella (Stephens, 1835)
Eriocrania sparrmannella (Bosc, 1791)

Euteliidae
Eutelia adulatrix (Hübner, 1813)

Gelechiidae
Acompsia cinerella (Clerck, 1759)
Acompsia tripunctella (Denis & Schiffermüller, 1775)
Agonochaetia intermedia Sattler, 1968
Altenia scriptella (Hübner, 1796)
Anacampsis blattariella (Hübner, 1796)
Anacampsis obscurella (Denis & Schiffermüller, 1775)
Anacampsis populella (Clerck, 1759)
Anacampsis scintillella (Fischer von Röslerstamm, 1841)
Anacampsis timidella (Wocke, 1887)
Anarsia eleagnella Kuznetsov, 1957
Anarsia lineatella Zeller, 1839
Anarsia spartiella (Schrank, 1802)
Anasphaltis renigerellus (Zeller, 1839)
Apodia bifractella (Duponchel, 1843)
Aproaerema anthyllidella (Hübner, 1813)
Argolamprotes micella (Denis & Schiffermüller, 1775)
Aristotelia calastomella (Christoph, 1873)
Aristotelia decoratella (Staudinger, 1879)
Aristotelia decurtella (Hübner, 1813)
Aristotelia ericinella (Zeller, 1839)
Aristotelia subdecurtella (Stainton, 1859)
Aristotelia subericinella (Duponchel, 1843)
Aroga flavicomella (Zeller, 1839)
Aroga velocella (Duponchel, 1838)
Athrips amoenella (Frey, 1882)
Athrips mouffetella (Linnaeus, 1758)
Athrips nigricostella (Duponchel, 1842)
Athrips rancidella (Herrich-Schäffer, 1854)
Atremaea lonchoptera Staudinger, 1871
Brachmia blandella (Fabricius, 1798)
Brachmia dimidiella (Denis & Schiffermüller, 1775)
Brachmia inornatella (Douglas, 1850)
Brachmia procursella Rebel, 1903
Bryotropha affinis (Haworth, 1828)
Bryotropha basaltinella (Zeller, 1839)
Bryotropha desertella (Douglas, 1850)
Bryotropha domestica (Haworth, 1828)
Bryotropha galbanella (Zeller, 1839)
Bryotropha patockai Elsner & Karsholt, 2003
Bryotropha senectella (Zeller, 1839)
Bryotropha similis (Stainton, 1854)
Bryotropha tachyptilella (Rebel, 1916)
Bryotropha terrella (Denis & Schiffermüller, 1775)
Carpatolechia aenigma (Sattler, 1983)
Carpatolechia alburnella (Zeller, 1839)
Carpatolechia decorella (Haworth, 1812)
Carpatolechia fugacella (Zeller, 1839)
Carpatolechia fugitivella (Zeller, 1839)
Carpatolechia notatella (Hübner, 1813)
Carpatolechia proximella (Hübner, 1796)
Caryocolum alsinella (Zeller, 1868)
Caryocolum amaurella (M. Hering, 1924)
Caryocolum blandella (Douglas, 1852)
Caryocolum blandulella (Tutt, 1887)
Caryocolum cauligenella (Schmid, 1863)
Caryocolum fischerella (Treitschke, 1833)
Caryocolum huebneri (Haworth, 1828)
Caryocolum inflativorella (Klimesch, 1938)
Caryocolum junctella (Douglas, 1851)
Caryocolum leucomelanella (Zeller, 1839)
Caryocolum leucothoracellum (Klimesch, 1953)
Caryocolum marmorea (Haworth, 1828)
Caryocolum petryi (O. Hofmann, 1899)
Caryocolum proxima (Haworth, 1828)
Caryocolum tricolorella (Haworth, 1812)
Caryocolum vicinella (Douglas, 1851)
Caryocolum viscariella (Stainton, 1855)
Catatinagma trivittellum Rebel, 1903
Caulastrocecis furfurella (Staudinger, 1871)
Chionodes distinctella (Zeller, 1839)
Chionodes electella (Zeller, 1839)
Chionodes fumatella (Douglas, 1850)
Chionodes ignorantella (Herrich-Schäffer, 1854)
Chionodes luctuella (Hübner, 1793)
Chionodes lugubrella (Fabricius, 1794)
Chionodes tragicella (Heyden, 1865)
Chrysoesthia drurella (Fabricius, 1775)
Chrysoesthia sexguttella (Thunberg, 1794)
Chrysoesthia verrucosa Tokar, 1999
Coleotechnites piceaella (Kearfott, 1903)
Cosmardia moritzella (Treitschke, 1835)
Crossobela trinotella (Herrich-Schäffer, 1856)
Dactylotula altithermella (Walsingham, 1903)
Dichomeris alacella (Zeller, 1839)
Dichomeris barbella (Denis & Schiffermüller, 1775)
Dichomeris derasella (Denis & Schiffermüller, 1775)
Dichomeris latipennella (Rebel, 1937)
Dichomeris limosellus (Schlager, 1849)
Dichomeris marginella (Fabricius, 1781)
Dichomeris rasilella (Herrich-Schäffer, 1854)
Dichomeris ustalella (Fabricius, 1794)
Dirhinosia cervinella (Eversmann, 1844)
Ephysteris inustella (Zeller, 1847)
Ephysteris promptella (Staudinger, 1859)
Eulamprotes atrella (Denis & Schiffermüller, 1775)
Eulamprotes plumbella (Heinemann, 1870)
Eulamprotes superbella (Zeller, 1839)
Eulamprotes unicolorella (Duponchel, 1843)
Eulamprotes wilkella (Linnaeus, 1758)
Exoteleia dodecella (Linnaeus, 1758)
Filatima spurcella (Duponchel, 1843)
Filatima tephritidella (Duponchel, 1844)
Filatima ukrainica Piskunov, 1971
Gelechia asinella (Hübner, 1796)
Gelechia basipunctella Herrich-Schäffer, 1854
Gelechia muscosella Zeller, 1839
Gelechia nigra (Haworth, 1828)
Gelechia rhombella (Denis & Schiffermüller, 1775)
Gelechia rhombelliformis Staudinger, 1871
Gelechia sabinellus (Zeller, 1839)
Gelechia scotinella Herrich-Schäffer, 1854
Gelechia senticetella (Staudinger, 1859)
Gelechia sestertiella Herrich-Schäffer, 1854
Gelechia sororculella (Hübner, 1817)
Gelechia turpella (Denis & Schiffermüller, 1775)
Gladiovalva aizpuruai Vives, 1990
Gnorimoschema herbichii (Nowicki, 1864)
Gnorimoschema soffneri Riedl, 1965
Helcystogramma albinervis (Gerasimov, 1929)
Helcystogramma arulensis (Rebel, 1929)
Helcystogramma lineolella (Zeller, 1839)
Helcystogramma lutatella (Herrich-Schäffer, 1854)
Helcystogramma rufescens (Haworth, 1828)
Helcystogramma triannulella (Herrich-Schäffer, 1854)
Holcophora statices Staudinger, 1871
Hypatima rhomboidella (Linnaeus, 1758)
Isophrictis anthemidella (Wocke, 1871)
Isophrictis striatella (Denis & Schiffermüller, 1775)
Iwaruna klimeschi Wolff, 1958
Klimeschiopsis kiningerella (Duponchel, 1843)
Megacraspedus balneariellus (Chretien, 1907)
Megacraspedus binotella (Duponchel, 1843)
Megacraspedus dolosellus (Zeller, 1839)
Megacraspedus fallax (Mann, 1867)
Megacraspedus imparellus (Fischer von Röslerstamm, 1843)
Megacraspedus lagopellus Herrich-Schäffer, 1860
Megacraspedus separatellus (Fischer von Röslerstamm, 1843)
Mesophleps silacella (Hübner, 1796)
Metzneria aestivella (Zeller, 1839)
Metzneria aprilella (Herrich-Schäffer, 1854)
Metzneria artificella (Herrich-Schäffer, 1861)
Metzneria ehikeella Gozmany, 1954
Metzneria intestinella (Mann, 1864)
Metzneria lappella (Linnaeus, 1758)
Metzneria metzneriella (Stainton, 1851)
Metzneria neuropterella (Zeller, 1839)
Metzneria paucipunctella (Zeller, 1839)
Metzneria santolinella (Amsel, 1936)
Metzneria subflavella Englert, 1974
Mirificarma cytisella (Treitschke, 1833)
Mirificarma eburnella (Denis & Schiffermüller, 1775)
Mirificarma lentiginosella (Zeller, 1839)
Mirificarma maculatella (Hübner, 1796)
Mirificarma mulinella (Zeller, 1839)
Monochroa arundinetella (Boyd, 1857)
Monochroa conspersella (Herrich-Schäffer, 1854)
Monochroa cytisella (Curtis, 1837)
Monochroa divisella (Douglas, 1850)
Monochroa elongella (Heinemann, 1870)
Monochroa hornigi (Staudinger, 1883)
Monochroa inflexella Svensson, 1992
Monochroa lucidella (Stephens, 1834)
Monochroa lutulentella (Zeller, 1839)
Monochroa niphognatha (Gozmany, 1953)
Monochroa nomadella (Zeller, 1868)
Monochroa palustrellus (Douglas, 1850)
Monochroa parvulata (Gozmany, 1957)
Monochroa rumicetella (O. Hofmann, 1868)
Monochroa sepicolella (Herrich-Schäffer, 1854)
Monochroa servella (Zeller, 1839)
Monochroa simplicella (Lienig & Zeller, 1846)
Monochroa tenebrella (Hübner, 1817)
Neofaculta ericetella (Geyer, 1832)
Neofaculta infernella (Herrich-Schäffer, 1854)
Neofriseria singula (Staudinger, 1876)
Neotelphusa sequax (Haworth, 1828)
Nothris lemniscellus (Zeller, 1839)
Nothris verbascella (Denis & Schiffermüller, 1775)
Ornativalva plutelliformis (Staudinger, 1859)
Parachronistis albiceps (Zeller, 1839)
Parastenolechia nigrinotella (Zeller, 1847)
Pexicopia malvella (Hübner, 1805)
Phthorimaea operculella (Zeller, 1873)
Platyedra subcinerea (Haworth, 1828)
Prolita solutella (Zeller, 1839)
Pseudotelphusa paripunctella (Thunberg, 1794)
Pseudotelphusa scalella (Scopoli, 1763)
Pseudotelphusa tessella (Linnaeus, 1758)
Psoricoptera gibbosella (Zeller, 1839)
Ptocheuusa abnormella (Herrich-Schäffer, 1854)
Ptocheuusa inopella (Zeller, 1839)
Ptocheuusa paupella (Zeller, 1847)
Pyncostola bohemiella (Nickerl, 1864)
Recurvaria leucatella (Clerck, 1759)
Recurvaria nanella (Denis & Schiffermüller, 1775)
Scrobipalpa acuminatella (Sircom, 1850)
Scrobipalpa arenbergeri Povolny, 1973
Scrobipalpa artemisiella (Treitschke, 1833)
Scrobipalpa atriplicella (Fischer von Röslerstamm, 1841)
Scrobipalpa chrysanthemella (E. Hofmann, 1867)
Scrobipalpa erichi Povolny, 1964
Scrobipalpa gallicella (Constant, 1885)
Scrobipalpa halonella (Herrich-Schäffer, 1854)
Scrobipalpa hungariae (Staudinger, 1871)
Scrobipalpa nitentella (Fuchs, 1902)
Scrobipalpa obsoletella (Fischer von Röslerstamm, 1841)
Scrobipalpa ocellatella (Boyd, 1858)
Scrobipalpa pauperella (Heinemann, 1870)
Scrobipalpa proclivella (Fuchs, 1886)
Scrobipalpa reiprichi Povolny, 1984
Scrobipalpa salinella (Zeller, 1847)
Scrobipalpa samadensis (Pfaffenzeller, 1870)
Scrobipalpa stangei (E. Hering, 1889)
Scrobipalpula diffluella (Frey, 1870)
Scrobipalpula psilella (Herrich-Schäffer, 1854)
Scrobipalpula tussilaginis (Stainton, 1867)
Sitotroga cerealella (Olivier, 1789)
Sophronia ascalis Gozmany, 1951
Sophronia chilonella (Treitschke, 1833)
Sophronia consanguinella Herrich-Schäffer, 1854
Sophronia humerella (Denis & Schiffermüller, 1775)
Sophronia illustrella (Hübner, 1796)
Sophronia semicostella (Hübner, 1813)
Sophronia sicariellus (Zeller, 1839)
Stenolechia gemmella (Linnaeus, 1758)
Stenolechiodes pseudogemmellus Elsner, 1996
Stomopteryx detersella (Zeller, 1847)
Stomopteryx hungaricella Gozmany, 1957
Stomopteryx remissella (Zeller, 1847)
Syncopacma albifrontella (Heinemann, 1870)
Syncopacma azosterella (Herrich-Schäffer, 1854)
Syncopacma captivella (Herrich-Schäffer, 1854)
Syncopacma cinctella (Clerck, 1759)
Syncopacma cincticulella (Bruand, 1851)
Syncopacma coronillella (Treitschke, 1833)
Syncopacma linella (Chretien, 1904)
Syncopacma ochrofasciella (Toll, 1936)
Syncopacma patruella (Mann, 1857)
Syncopacma sangiella (Stainton, 1863)
Syncopacma suecicella (Wolff, 1958)
Syncopacma taeniolella (Zeller, 1839)
Syncopacma vinella (Bankes, 1898)
Syncopacma wormiella (Wolff, 1958)
Teleiodes flavimaculella (Herrich-Schäffer, 1854)
Teleiodes luculella (Hübner, 1813)
Teleiodes saltuum (Zeller, 1878)
Teleiodes vulgella (Denis & Schiffermüller, 1775)
Teleiodes wagae (Nowicki, 1860)
Teleiopsis diffinis (Haworth, 1828)
Thiotricha subocellea (Stephens, 1834)
Xystophora carchariella (Zeller, 1839)
Xystophora pulveratella (Herrich-Schäffer, 1854)

Geometridae
Abraxas grossulariata (Linnaeus, 1758)
Abraxas sylvata (Scopoli, 1763)
Acasis appensata (Eversmann, 1842)
Acasis viretata (Hübner, 1799)
Aethalura punctulata (Denis & Schiffermüller, 1775)
Agriopis aurantiaria (Hübner, 1799)
Agriopis bajaria (Denis & Schiffermüller, 1775)
Agriopis leucophaearia (Denis & Schiffermüller, 1775)
Agriopis marginaria (Fabricius, 1776)
Alcis bastelbergeri (Hirschke, 1908)
Alcis jubata (Thunberg, 1788)
Alcis repandata (Linnaeus, 1758)
Alsophila aceraria (Denis & Schiffermüller, 1775)
Alsophila aescularia (Denis & Schiffermüller, 1775)
Angerona prunaria (Linnaeus, 1758)
Anticlea derivata (Denis & Schiffermüller, 1775)
Anticollix sparsata (Treitschke, 1828)
Apeira syringaria (Linnaeus, 1758)
Aplasta ononaria (Fuessly, 1783)
Aplocera efformata (Guenee, 1858)
Aplocera plagiata (Linnaeus, 1758)
Aplocera praeformata (Hübner, 1826)
Apocheima hispidaria (Denis & Schiffermüller, 1775)
Archiearis parthenias (Linnaeus, 1761)
Artiora evonymaria (Denis & Schiffermüller, 1775)
Ascotis selenaria (Denis & Schiffermüller, 1775)
Aspitates gilvaria (Denis & Schiffermüller, 1775)
Asthena albulata (Hufnagel, 1767)
Asthena anseraria (Herrich-Schäffer, 1855)
Biston betularia (Linnaeus, 1758)
Biston strataria (Hufnagel, 1767)
Boudinotiana notha (Hübner, 1803)
Boudinotiana puella (Esper, 1787)
Bupalus piniaria (Linnaeus, 1758)
Cabera exanthemata (Scopoli, 1763)
Cabera pusaria (Linnaeus, 1758)
Campaea honoraria (Denis & Schiffermüller, 1775)
Campaea margaritaria (Linnaeus, 1761)
Camptogramma bilineata (Linnaeus, 1758)
Camptogramma scripturata (Hübner, 1799)
Cataclysme riguata (Hübner, 1813)
Catarhoe cuculata (Hufnagel, 1767)
Catarhoe rubidata (Denis & Schiffermüller, 1775)
Cepphis advenaria (Hübner, 1790)
Chariaspilates formosaria (Eversmann, 1837)
Charissa obscurata (Denis & Schiffermüller, 1775)
Charissa pullata (Denis & Schiffermüller, 1775)
Charissa variegata (Duponchel, 1830)
Charissa ambiguata (Duponchel, 1830)
Charissa intermedia (Wehrli, 1917)
Chesias legatella (Denis & Schiffermüller, 1775)
Chesias rufata (Fabricius, 1775)
Chiasmia clathrata (Linnaeus, 1758)
Chlorissa cloraria (Hübner, 1813)
Chlorissa viridata (Linnaeus, 1758)
Chloroclysta miata (Linnaeus, 1758)
Chloroclysta siterata (Hufnagel, 1767)
Chloroclystis v-ata (Haworth, 1809)
Chondrosoma fiduciaria Anker, 1854
Cidaria fulvata (Forster, 1771)
Cleora cinctaria (Denis & Schiffermüller, 1775)
Cleorodes lichenaria (Hufnagel, 1767)
Coenocalpe lapidata (Hübner, 1809)
Coenotephria salicata (Denis & Schiffermüller, 1775)
Colostygia olivata (Denis & Schiffermüller, 1775)
Colostygia pectinataria (Knoch, 1781)
Colotois pennaria (Linnaeus, 1761)
Comibaena bajularia (Denis & Schiffermüller, 1775)
Cosmorhoe ocellata (Linnaeus, 1758)
Costaconvexa polygrammata (Borkhausen, 1794)
Crocallis elinguaria (Linnaeus, 1758)
Crocallis tusciaria (Borkhausen, 1793)
Cyclophora linearia (Hübner, 1799)
Cyclophora porata (Linnaeus, 1767)
Cyclophora punctaria (Linnaeus, 1758)
Cyclophora suppunctaria (Zeller, 1847)
Cyclophora albiocellaria (Hübner, 1789)
Cyclophora albipunctata (Hufnagel, 1767)
Cyclophora annularia (Fabricius, 1775)
Cyclophora pendularia (Clerck, 1759)
Cyclophora puppillaria (Hübner, 1799)
Cyclophora quercimontaria (Bastelberger, 1897)
Cyclophora ruficiliaria (Herrich-Schäffer, 1855)
Deileptenia ribeata (Clerck, 1759)
Dyscia conspersaria (Denis & Schiffermüller, 1775)
Dysstroma citrata (Linnaeus, 1761)
Dysstroma truncata (Hufnagel, 1767)
Earophila badiata (Denis & Schiffermüller, 1775)
Ecliptopera capitata (Herrich-Schäffer, 1839)
Ecliptopera silaceata (Denis & Schiffermüller, 1775)
Ectropis crepuscularia (Denis & Schiffermüller, 1775)
Eilicrinia cordiaria (Hübner, 1790)
Eilicrinia trinotata (Metzner, 1845)
Electrophaes corylata (Thunberg, 1792)
Elophos serotinaria (Denis & Schiffermüller, 1775)
Ematurga atomaria (Linnaeus, 1758)
Ennomos alniaria (Linnaeus, 1758)
Ennomos autumnaria (Werneburg, 1859)
Ennomos erosaria (Denis & Schiffermüller, 1775)
Ennomos fuscantaria (Haworth, 1809)
Ennomos quercaria (Hübner, 1813)
Ennomos quercinaria (Hufnagel, 1767)
Entephria caesiata (Denis & Schiffermüller, 1775)
Entephria cyanata (Hübner, 1809)
Epione repandaria (Hufnagel, 1767)
Epione vespertaria (Linnaeus, 1767)
Epirranthis diversata (Denis & Schiffermüller, 1775)
Epirrhoe alternata (Muller, 1764)
Epirrhoe galiata (Denis & Schiffermüller, 1775)
Epirrhoe hastulata (Hübner, 1790)
Epirrhoe molluginata (Hübner, 1813)
Epirrhoe pupillata (Thunberg, 1788)
Epirrhoe rivata (Hübner, 1813)
Epirrhoe tristata (Linnaeus, 1758)
Epirrita autumnata (Borkhausen, 1794)
Epirrita christyi (Allen, 1906)
Epirrita dilutata (Denis & Schiffermüller, 1775)
Erannis ankeraria (Staudinger, 1861)
Erannis defoliaria (Clerck, 1759)
Euchoeca nebulata (Scopoli, 1763)
Eucrostes indigenata (de Villers, 1789)
Eulithis mellinata (Fabricius, 1787)
Eulithis populata (Linnaeus, 1758)
Eulithis prunata (Linnaeus, 1758)
Eulithis testata (Linnaeus, 1761)
Eumannia lepraria (Rebel, 1909)
Euphyia biangulata (Haworth, 1809)
Euphyia frustata (Treitschke, 1828)
Euphyia unangulata (Haworth, 1809)
Eupithecia abbreviata Stephens, 1831
Eupithecia abietaria (Goeze, 1781)
Eupithecia absinthiata (Clerck, 1759)
Eupithecia actaeata Walderdorff, 1869
Eupithecia addictata Dietze, 1908
Eupithecia alliaria Staudinger, 1870
Eupithecia analoga Djakonov, 1926
Eupithecia assimilata Doubleday, 1856
Eupithecia breviculata (Donzel, 1837)
Eupithecia cauchiata (Duponchel, 1831)
Eupithecia centaureata (Denis & Schiffermüller, 1775)
Eupithecia denotata (Hübner, 1813)
Eupithecia denticulata (Treitschke, 1828)
Eupithecia distinctaria Herrich-Schäffer, 1848
Eupithecia dodoneata Guenee, 1858
Eupithecia egenaria Herrich-Schäffer, 1848
Eupithecia ericeata (Rambur, 1833)
Eupithecia exiguata (Hübner, 1813)
Eupithecia expallidata Doubleday, 1856
Eupithecia extraversaria Herrich-Schäffer, 1852
Eupithecia extremata (Fabricius, 1787)
Eupithecia gemellata Herrich-Schäffer, 1861
Eupithecia graphata (Treitschke, 1828)
Eupithecia gueneata Milliere, 1862
Eupithecia haworthiata Doubleday, 1856
Eupithecia icterata (de Villers, 1789)
Eupithecia immundata (Lienig, 1846)
Eupithecia impurata (Hübner, 1813)
Eupithecia indigata (Hübner, 1813)
Eupithecia innotata (Hufnagel, 1767)
Eupithecia insigniata (Hübner, 1790)
Eupithecia intricata (Zetterstedt, 1839)
Eupithecia inturbata (Hübner, 1817)
Eupithecia irriguata (Hübner, 1813)
Eupithecia lanceata (Hübner, 1825)
Eupithecia laquaearia Herrich-Schäffer, 1848
Eupithecia lariciata (Freyer, 1841)
Eupithecia linariata (Denis & Schiffermüller, 1775)
Eupithecia millefoliata Rossler, 1866
Eupithecia nanata (Hübner, 1813)
Eupithecia ochridata Schutze & Pinker, 1968
Eupithecia orphnata W. Petersen, 1909
Eupithecia pauxillaria Boisduval, 1840
Eupithecia pernotata Guenee, 1858
Eupithecia pimpinellata (Hübner, 1813)
Eupithecia plumbeolata (Haworth, 1809)
Eupithecia pulchellata Stephens, 1831
Eupithecia pusillata (Denis & Schiffermüller, 1775)
Eupithecia pygmaeata (Hübner, 1799)
Eupithecia pyreneata Mabille, 1871
Eupithecia satyrata (Hübner, 1813)
Eupithecia selinata Herrich-Schäffer, 1861
Eupithecia semigraphata Bruand, 1850
Eupithecia silenicolata Mabille, 1867
Eupithecia simpliciata (Haworth, 1809)
Eupithecia sinuosaria (Eversmann, 1848)
Eupithecia spadiceata Zerny, 1933
Eupithecia subfuscata (Haworth, 1809)
Eupithecia subumbrata (Denis & Schiffermüller, 1775)
Eupithecia succenturiata (Linnaeus, 1758)
Eupithecia tantillaria Boisduval, 1840
Eupithecia tenuiata (Hübner, 1813)
Eupithecia tripunctaria Herrich-Schäffer, 1852
Eupithecia trisignaria Herrich-Schäffer, 1848
Eupithecia unedonata Mabille, 1868
Eupithecia valerianata (Hübner, 1813)
Eupithecia venosata (Fabricius, 1787)
Eupithecia veratraria Herrich-Schäffer, 1848
Eupithecia virgaureata Doubleday, 1861
Eupithecia vulgata (Haworth, 1809)
Eustroma reticulata (Denis & Schiffermüller, 1775)
Fagivorina arenaria (Hufnagel, 1767)
Gagitodes sagittata (Fabricius, 1787)
Gandaritis pyraliata (Denis & Schiffermüller, 1775)
Geometra papilionaria (Linnaeus, 1758)
Gnophos furvata (Denis & Schiffermüller, 1775)
Gnophos dumetata Treitschke, 1827
Gymnoscelis rufifasciata (Haworth, 1809)
Heliomata glarearia (Denis & Schiffermüller, 1775)
Hemistola chrysoprasaria (Esper, 1795)
Hemithea aestivaria (Hübner, 1789)
Horisme aquata (Hübner, 1813)
Horisme corticata (Treitschke, 1835)
Horisme radicaria (de La Harpe, 1855)
Horisme tersata (Denis & Schiffermüller, 1775)
Horisme vitalbata (Denis & Schiffermüller, 1775)
Hydrelia flammeolaria (Hufnagel, 1767)
Hydrelia sylvata (Denis & Schiffermüller, 1775)
Hydria cervinalis (Scopoli, 1763)
Hydria undulata (Linnaeus, 1758)
Hydriomena furcata (Thunberg, 1784)
Hydriomena impluviata (Denis & Schiffermüller, 1775)
Hylaea fasciaria (Linnaeus, 1758)
Hypomecis danieli (Wehrli, 1932)
Hypomecis punctinalis (Scopoli, 1763)
Hypomecis roboraria (Denis & Schiffermüller, 1775)
Hypoxystis pluviaria (Fabricius, 1787)
Idaea aureolaria (Denis & Schiffermüller, 1775)
Idaea aversata (Linnaeus, 1758)
Idaea biselata (Hufnagel, 1767)
Idaea degeneraria (Hübner, 1799)
Idaea deversaria (Herrich-Schäffer, 1847)
Idaea dilutaria (Hübner, 1799)
Idaea dimidiata (Hufnagel, 1767)
Idaea elongaria (Rambur, 1833)
Idaea emarginata (Linnaeus, 1758)
Idaea filicata (Hübner, 1799)
Idaea fuscovenosa (Goeze, 1781)
Idaea humiliata (Hufnagel, 1767)
Idaea inquinata (Scopoli, 1763)
Idaea laevigata (Scopoli, 1763)
Idaea moniliata (Denis & Schiffermüller, 1775)
Idaea muricata (Hufnagel, 1767)
Idaea nitidata (Herrich-Schäffer, 1861)
Idaea obsoletaria (Rambur, 1833)
Idaea ochrata (Scopoli, 1763)
Idaea pallidata (Denis & Schiffermüller, 1775)
Idaea politaria (Hübner, 1799)
Idaea rubraria (Staudinger, 1901)
Idaea rufaria (Hübner, 1799)
Idaea rusticata (Denis & Schiffermüller, 1775)
Idaea seriata (Schrank, 1802)
Idaea sericeata (Hübner, 1813)
Idaea serpentata (Hufnagel, 1767)
Idaea straminata (Borkhausen, 1794)
Idaea subsericeata (Haworth, 1809)
Idaea sylvestraria (Hübner, 1799)
Idaea trigeminata (Haworth, 1809)
Isturgia arenacearia (Denis & Schiffermüller, 1775)
Isturgia murinaria (Denis & Schiffermüller, 1775)
Isturgia roraria (Fabricius, 1776)
Jodis lactearia (Linnaeus, 1758)
Lampropteryx suffumata (Denis & Schiffermüller, 1775)
Larentia clavaria (Haworth, 1809)
Ligdia adustata (Denis & Schiffermüller, 1775)
Lignyoptera fumidaria (Hübner, 1825)
Lithostege farinata (Hufnagel, 1767)
Lithostege griseata (Denis & Schiffermüller, 1775)
Lobophora halterata (Hufnagel, 1767)
Lomaspilis marginata (Linnaeus, 1758)
Lomographa bimaculata (Fabricius, 1775)
Lomographa temerata (Denis & Schiffermüller, 1775)
Lycia hirtaria (Clerck, 1759)
Lycia pomonaria (Hübner, 1790)
Lycia zonaria (Denis & Schiffermüller, 1775)
Lythria cruentaria (Hufnagel, 1767)
Lythria purpuraria (Linnaeus, 1758)
Macaria alternata (Denis & Schiffermüller, 1775)
Macaria artesiaria (Denis & Schiffermüller, 1775)
Macaria brunneata (Thunberg, 1784)
Macaria liturata (Clerck, 1759)
Macaria notata (Linnaeus, 1758)
Macaria signaria (Hübner, 1809)
Macaria wauaria (Linnaeus, 1758)
Melanthia procellata (Denis & Schiffermüller, 1775)
Mesoleuca albicillata (Linnaeus, 1758)
Mesotype didymata (Linnaeus, 1758)
Mesotype parallelolineata (Retzius, 1783)
Minoa murinata (Scopoli, 1763)
Narraga fasciolaria (Hufnagel, 1767)
Narraga tessularia (Metzner, 1845)
Nothocasis sertata (Hübner, 1817)
Nychiodes dalmatina Wagner, 1909
Nycterosea obstipata (Fabricius, 1794)
Odezia atrata (Linnaeus, 1758)
Odontopera bidentata (Clerck, 1759)
Operophtera brumata (Linnaeus, 1758)
Operophtera fagata (Scharfenberg, 1805)
Opisthograptis luteolata (Linnaeus, 1758)
Orthonama vittata (Borkhausen, 1794)
Orthostixis cribraria (Hübner, 1799)
Ourapteryx sambucaria (Linnaeus, 1758)
Pachycnemia hippocastanaria (Hübner, 1799)
Paraboarmia viertlii (Bohatsch, 1883)
Paradarisa consonaria (Hübner, 1799)
Pareulype berberata (Denis & Schiffermüller, 1775)
Pasiphila chloerata (Mabille, 1870)
Pasiphila debiliata (Hübner, 1817)
Pasiphila rectangulata (Linnaeus, 1758)
Pelurga comitata (Linnaeus, 1758)
Pennithera firmata (Hübner, 1822)
Perconia strigillaria (Hübner, 1787)
Peribatodes rhomboidaria (Denis & Schiffermüller, 1775)
Peribatodes secundaria (Denis & Schiffermüller, 1775)
Peribatodes umbraria (Hübner, 1809)
Perizoma affinitata (Stephens, 1831)
Perizoma albulata (Denis & Schiffermüller, 1775)
Perizoma alchemillata (Linnaeus, 1758)
Perizoma bifaciata (Haworth, 1809)
Perizoma blandiata (Denis & Schiffermüller, 1775)
Perizoma flavofasciata (Thunberg, 1792)
Perizoma hydrata (Treitschke, 1829)
Perizoma lugdunaria (Herrich-Schäffer, 1855)
Perizoma minorata (Treitschke, 1828)
Petrophora chlorosata (Scopoli, 1763)
Phaiogramma etruscaria (Zeller, 1849)
Phibalapteryx virgata (Hufnagel, 1767)
Phigalia pilosaria (Denis & Schiffermüller, 1775)
Philereme transversata (Hufnagel, 1767)
Philereme vetulata (Denis & Schiffermüller, 1775)
Phyllometra culminaria (Eversmann, 1843)
Plagodis dolabraria (Linnaeus, 1767)
Plagodis pulveraria (Linnaeus, 1758)
Plemyria rubiginata (Denis & Schiffermüller, 1775)
Pseudopanthera macularia (Linnaeus, 1758)
Pseudoterpna pruinata (Hufnagel, 1767)
Pterapherapteryx sexalata (Retzius, 1783)
Pungeleria capreolaria (Denis & Schiffermüller, 1775)
Rheumaptera hastata (Linnaeus, 1758)
Rhodometra sacraria (Linnaeus, 1767)
Rhodostrophia vibicaria (Clerck, 1759)
Schistostege decussata (Denis & Schiffermüller, 1775)
Scopula flaccidaria (Zeller, 1852)
Scopula floslactata (Haworth, 1809)
Scopula immutata (Linnaeus, 1758)
Scopula incanata (Linnaeus, 1758)
Scopula marginepunctata (Goeze, 1781)
Scopula subpunctaria (Herrich-Schäffer, 1847)
Scopula caricaria (Reutti, 1853)
Scopula corrivalaria (Kretschmar, 1862)
Scopula decorata (Denis & Schiffermüller, 1775)
Scopula immorata (Linnaeus, 1758)
Scopula nemoraria (Hübner, 1799)
Scopula nigropunctata (Hufnagel, 1767)
Scopula ornata (Scopoli, 1763)
Scopula rubiginata (Hufnagel, 1767)
Scopula umbelaria (Hübner, 1813)
Scopula virgulata (Denis & Schiffermüller, 1775)
Scotopteryx bipunctaria (Denis & Schiffermüller, 1775)
Scotopteryx chenopodiata (Linnaeus, 1758)
Scotopteryx coarctaria (Denis & Schiffermüller, 1775)
Scotopteryx ignorata Huemer & Hausmann, 1998
Scotopteryx luridata (Hufnagel, 1767)
Scotopteryx moeniata (Scopoli, 1763)
Scotopteryx mucronata (Scopoli, 1763)
Selenia dentaria (Fabricius, 1775)
Selenia lunularia (Hübner, 1788)
Selenia tetralunaria (Hufnagel, 1767)
Selidosema brunnearia (de Villers, 1789)
Selidosema plumaria (Denis & Schiffermüller, 1775)
Siona lineata (Scopoli, 1763)
Spargania luctuata (Denis & Schiffermüller, 1775)
Stegania cararia (Hübner, 1790)
Stegania dilectaria (Hübner, 1790)
Synopsia sociaria (Hübner, 1799)
Tephronia sepiaria (Hufnagel, 1767)
Thalera fimbrialis (Scopoli, 1763)
Thera britannica (Turner, 1925)
Thera cognata (Thunberg, 1792)
Thera juniperata (Linnaeus, 1758)
Thera obeliscata (Hübner, 1787)
Thera variata (Denis & Schiffermüller, 1775)
Thera vetustata (Denis & Schiffermüller, 1775)
Therapis flavicaria (Denis & Schiffermüller, 1775)
Theria rupicapraria (Denis & Schiffermüller, 1775)
Thetidia smaragdaria (Fabricius, 1787)
Timandra comae Schmidt, 1931
Trichopteryx carpinata (Borkhausen, 1794)
Trichopteryx polycommata (Denis & Schiffermüller, 1775)
Triphosa dubitata (Linnaeus, 1758)
Venusia blomeri (Curtis, 1832)
Xanthorhoe biriviata (Borkhausen, 1794)
Xanthorhoe designata (Hufnagel, 1767)
Xanthorhoe ferrugata (Clerck, 1759)
Xanthorhoe fluctuata (Linnaeus, 1758)
Xanthorhoe montanata (Denis & Schiffermüller, 1775)
Xanthorhoe quadrifasiata (Clerck, 1759)
Xanthorhoe spadicearia (Denis & Schiffermüller, 1775)

Glyphipterigidae
Acrolepia autumnitella Curtis, 1838
Acrolepiopsis assectella (Zeller, 1839)
Acrolepiopsis tauricella (Staudinger, 1870)
Digitivalva arnicella (Heyden, 1863)
Digitivalva perlepidella (Stainton, 1849)
Digitivalva reticulella (Hübner, 1796)
Digitivalva valeriella (Snellen, 1878)
Digitivalva granitella (Treitschke, 1833)
Digitivalva pulicariae (Klimesch, 1956)
Glyphipterix bergstraesserella (Fabricius, 1781)
Glyphipterix equitella (Scopoli, 1763)
Glyphipterix forsterella (Fabricius, 1781)
Glyphipterix haworthana (Stephens, 1834)
Glyphipterix loricatella (Treitschke, 1833)
Glyphipterix pygmaeella Rebel, 1896
Glyphipterix simpliciella (Stephens, 1834)
Glyphipterix thrasonella (Scopoli, 1763)
Orthotelia sparganella (Thunberg, 1788)

Gracillariidae
Acrocercops brongniardella (Fabricius, 1798)
Aspilapteryx limosella (Duponchel, 1843)
Aspilapteryx tringipennella (Zeller, 1839)
Callisto denticulella (Thunberg, 1794)
Caloptilia alchimiella (Scopoli, 1763)
Caloptilia cuculipennella (Hübner, 1796)
Caloptilia elongella (Linnaeus, 1761)
Caloptilia falconipennella (Hübner, 1813)
Caloptilia fidella (Reutti, 1853)
Caloptilia fribergensis (Fritzsche, 1871)
Caloptilia hauderi (Rebel, 1906)
Caloptilia hemidactylella (Denis & Schiffermüller, 1775)
Caloptilia honoratella (Rebel, 1914)
Caloptilia populetorum (Zeller, 1839)
Caloptilia rhodinella (Herrich-Schäffer, 1855)
Caloptilia robustella Jackh, 1972
Caloptilia roscipennella (Hübner, 1796)
Caloptilia rufipennella (Hübner, 1796)
Caloptilia semifascia (Haworth, 1828)
Caloptilia stigmatella (Fabricius, 1781)
Calybites phasianipennella (Hübner, 1813)
Calybites quadrisignella (Zeller, 1839)
Cameraria ohridella Deschka & Dimic, 1986
Dialectica imperialella (Zeller, 1847)
Dialectica soffneri (Gregor & Povolny, 1965)
Euspilapteryx auroguttella Stephens, 1835
Gracillaria loriolella Frey, 1881
Gracillaria syringella (Fabricius, 1794)
Leucospilapteryx omissella (Stainton, 1848)
Micrurapteryx kollariella (Zeller, 1839)
Ornixola caudulatella (Zeller, 1839)
Parectopa ononidis (Zeller, 1839)
Parectopa robiniella Clemens, 1863
Parornix anglicella (Stainton, 1850)
Parornix anguliferella (Zeller, 1847)
Parornix betulae (Stainton, 1854)
Parornix carpinella (Frey, 1863)
Parornix devoniella (Stainton, 1850)
Parornix fagivora (Frey, 1861)
Parornix finitimella (Zeller, 1850)
Parornix petiolella (Frey, 1863)
Parornix scoticella (Stainton, 1850)
Parornix szocsi Gozmany, 1952
Parornix tenella (Rebel, 1919)
Parornix torquillella (Zeller, 1850)
Phyllocnistis labyrinthella (Bjerkander, 1790)
Phyllocnistis saligna (Zeller, 1839)
Phyllocnistis unipunctella (Stephens, 1834)
Phyllonorycter abrasella (Duponchel, 1843)
Phyllonorycter acaciella (Duponchel, 1843)
Phyllonorycter acerifoliella (Zeller, 1839)
Phyllonorycter agilella (Zeller, 1846)
Phyllonorycter blancardella (Fabricius, 1781)
Phyllonorycter cavella (Zeller, 1846)
Phyllonorycter cerasicolella (Herrich-Schäffer, 1855)
Phyllonorycter cerasinella (Reutti, 1852)
Phyllonorycter comparella (Duponchel, 1843)
Phyllonorycter connexella (Zeller, 1846)
Phyllonorycter coryli (Nicelli, 1851)
Phyllonorycter corylifoliella (Hübner, 1796)
Phyllonorycter delitella (Duponchel, 1843)
Phyllonorycter distentella (Zeller, 1846)
Phyllonorycter dubitella (Herrich-Schäffer, 1855)
Phyllonorycter emberizaepenella (Bouche, 1834)
Phyllonorycter esperella (Goeze, 1783)
Phyllonorycter eugregori A. & Z. Lastuvka, 2006
Phyllonorycter fraxinella (Zeller, 1846)
Phyllonorycter froelichiella (Zeller, 1839)
Phyllonorycter geniculella (Ragonot, 1874)
Phyllonorycter harrisella (Linnaeus, 1761)
Phyllonorycter heegeriella (Zeller, 1846)
Phyllonorycter helianthemella (Herrich-Schäffer, 1861)
Phyllonorycter hilarella (Zetterstedt, 1839)
Phyllonorycter ilicifoliella (Duponchel, 1843)
Phyllonorycter insignitella (Zeller, 1846)
Phyllonorycter issikii (Kumata, 1963)
Phyllonorycter joannisi (Le Marchand, 1936)
Phyllonorycter klemannella (Fabricius, 1781)
Phyllonorycter kuhlweiniella (Zeller, 1839)
Phyllonorycter lantanella (Schrank, 1802)
Phyllonorycter lautella (Zeller, 1846)
Phyllonorycter leucographella (Zeller, 1850)
Phyllonorycter maestingella (Muller, 1764)
Phyllonorycter mannii (Zeller, 1846)
Phyllonorycter medicaginella (Gerasimov, 1930)
Phyllonorycter mespilella (Hübner, 1805)
Phyllonorycter messaniella (Zeller, 1846)
Phyllonorycter muelleriella (Zeller, 1839)
Phyllonorycter nicellii (Stainton, 1851)
Phyllonorycter nigrescentella (Logan, 1851)
Phyllonorycter oxyacanthae (Frey, 1856)
Phyllonorycter parisiella (Wocke, 1848)
Phyllonorycter pastorella (Zeller, 1846)
Phyllonorycter platani (Staudinger, 1870)
Phyllonorycter populifoliella (Treitschke, 1833)
Phyllonorycter quercifoliella (Zeller, 1839)
Phyllonorycter quinqueguttella (Stainton, 1851)
Phyllonorycter rajella (Linnaeus, 1758)
Phyllonorycter robiniella (Clemens, 1859)
Phyllonorycter roboris (Zeller, 1839)
Phyllonorycter sagitella (Bjerkander, 1790)
Phyllonorycter salicicolella (Sircom, 1848)
Phyllonorycter salictella (Zeller, 1846)
Phyllonorycter schreberella (Fabricius, 1781)
Phyllonorycter scitulella (Duponchel, 1843)
Phyllonorycter sorbi (Frey, 1855)
Phyllonorycter spinicolella (Zeller, 1846)
Phyllonorycter staintoniella (Nicelli, 1853)
Phyllonorycter stettinensis (Nicelli, 1852)
Phyllonorycter strigulatella (Lienig & Zeller, 1846)
Phyllonorycter tenerella (de Joannis, 1915)
Phyllonorycter tristrigella (Haworth, 1828)
Phyllonorycter ulmifoliella (Hübner, 1817)
Povolnya leucapennella (Stephens, 1835)
Sauterina hofmanniella (Schleich, 1867)
Spulerina simploniella (Fischer von Röslerstamm, 1840)

Heliodinidae
Heliodines roesella (Linnaeus, 1758)

Heliozelidae
Antispila metallella (Denis & Schiffermüller, 1775)
Antispila treitschkiella (Fischer von Röslerstamm, 1843)
Heliozela resplendella (Stainton, 1851)
Heliozela sericiella (Haworth, 1828)

Hepialidae
Hepialus humuli (Linnaeus, 1758)
Pharmacis carna (Denis & Schiffermüller, 1775)
Pharmacis fusconebulosa (DeGeer, 1778)
Pharmacis lupulina (Linnaeus, 1758)
Phymatopus hecta (Linnaeus, 1758)
Triodia amasinus (Herrich-Schäffer, 1851)
Triodia sylvina (Linnaeus, 1761)

Incurvariidae
Incurvaria koerneriella (Zeller, 1839)
Incurvaria masculella (Denis & Schiffermüller, 1775)
Incurvaria oehlmanniella (Hübner, 1796)
Incurvaria pectinea Haworth, 1828
Incurvaria praelatella (Denis & Schiffermüller, 1775)
Phylloporia bistrigella (Haworth, 1828)
Vespina slovaciella (Zagulajev & Tokar, 1990)

Lasiocampidae
Cosmotriche lobulina (Denis & Schiffermüller, 1775)
Dendrolimus pini (Linnaeus, 1758)
Eriogaster catax (Linnaeus, 1758)
Eriogaster lanestris (Linnaeus, 1758)
Eriogaster rimicola (Denis & Schiffermüller, 1775)
Euthrix potatoria (Linnaeus, 1758)
Gastropacha quercifolia (Linnaeus, 1758)
Gastropacha populifolia (Denis & Schiffermüller, 1775)
Lasiocampa quercus (Linnaeus, 1758)
Lasiocampa trifolii (Denis & Schiffermüller, 1775)
Macrothylacia rubi (Linnaeus, 1758)
Malacosoma castrensis (Linnaeus, 1758)
Malacosoma neustria (Linnaeus, 1758)
Odonestis pruni (Linnaeus, 1758)
Phyllodesma ilicifolia (Linnaeus, 1758)
Phyllodesma tremulifolia (Hübner, 1810)
Poecilocampa populi (Linnaeus, 1758)
Trichiura crataegi (Linnaeus, 1758)

Lecithoceridae
Homaloxestis briantiella (Turati, 1879)
Lecithocera nigrana (Duponchel, 1836)
Odites kollarella (O. G. Costa, 1832)

Limacodidae
Apoda limacodes (Hufnagel, 1766)
Heterogenea asella (Denis & Schiffermüller, 1775)

Lyonetiidae
Leucoptera aceris (Fuchs, 1903)
Leucoptera cytisiphagella Klimesch, 1938
Leucoptera genistae (M. Hering, 1933)
Leucoptera heringiella Toll, 1938
Leucoptera laburnella (Stainton, 1851)
Leucoptera lotella (Stainton, 1859)
Leucoptera lustratella (Herrich-Schäffer, 1855)
Leucoptera malifoliella (O. Costa, 1836)
Leucoptera onobrychidella Klimesch, 1937
Leucoptera sinuella (Reutti, 1853)
Leucoptera spartifoliella (Hübner, 1813)
Lyonetia clerkella (Linnaeus, 1758)
Lyonetia ledi Wocke, 1859
Lyonetia prunifoliella (Hübner, 1796)

Lypusidae
Amphisbatis incongruella (Stainton, 1849)
Lypusa tokari Elsner, Liska & Petru, 2008
Pseudatemelia flavifrontella (Denis & Schiffermüller, 1775)
Pseudatemelia subochreella (Doubleday, 1859)
Pseudatemelia elsae Svensson, 1982
Pseudatemelia josephinae (Toll, 1956)

Micropterigidae
Micropterix aruncella (Scopoli, 1763)
Micropterix aureatella (Scopoli, 1763)
Micropterix calthella (Linnaeus, 1761)
Micropterix mansuetella Zeller, 1844
Micropterix myrtetella Zeller, 1850
Micropterix tunbergella (Fabricius, 1787)

Millieridae
Millieria dolosalis (Heydenreich, 1851)

Momphidae
Mompha langiella (Hübner, 1796)
Mompha idaei (Zeller, 1839)
Mompha miscella (Denis & Schiffermüller, 1775)
Mompha bradleyi Riedl, 1965
Mompha confusella Koster & Sinev, 1996
Mompha conturbatella (Hübner, 1819)
Mompha divisella Herrich-Schäffer, 1854
Mompha epilobiella (Denis & Schiffermüller, 1775)
Mompha lacteella (Stephens, 1834)
Mompha ochraceella (Curtis, 1839)
Mompha propinquella (Stainton, 1851)
Mompha sturnipennella (Treitschke, 1833)
Mompha subbistrigella (Haworth, 1828)
Mompha locupletella (Denis & Schiffermüller, 1775)
Mompha raschkiella (Zeller, 1839)
Mompha terminella (Humphreys & Westwood, 1845)

Nepticulidae
Acalyptris loranthella (Klimesch, 1937)
Bohemannia pulverosella (Stainton, 1849)
Ectoedemia agrimoniae (Frey, 1858)
Ectoedemia albifasciella (Heinemann, 1871)
Ectoedemia angulifasciella (Stainton, 1849)
Ectoedemia arcuatella (Herrich-Schäffer, 1855)
Ectoedemia argyropeza (Zeller, 1839)
Ectoedemia atricollis (Stainton, 1857)
Ectoedemia caradjai (Groschke, 1944)
Ectoedemia cerris (Zimmermann, 1944)
Ectoedemia contorta van Nieukerken, 1985
Ectoedemia gilvipennella (Klimesch, 1946)
Ectoedemia hannoverella (Glitz, 1872)
Ectoedemia heringi (Toll, 1934)
Ectoedemia hexapetalae (Szocs, 1957)
Ectoedemia intimella (Zeller, 1848)
Ectoedemia klimeschi (Skala, 1933)
Ectoedemia liechtensteini (Zimmermann, 1944)
Ectoedemia mahalebella (Klimesch, 1936)
Ectoedemia occultella (Linnaeus, 1767)
Ectoedemia preisseckeri (Klimesch, 1941)
Ectoedemia rubivora (Wocke, 1860)
Ectoedemia rufifrontella (Caradja, 1920)
Ectoedemia spinosella (de Joannis, 1908)
Ectoedemia spiraeae Gregor & Povolny, 1983
Ectoedemia subbimaculella (Haworth, 1828)
Ectoedemia turbidella (Zeller, 1848)
Ectoedemia decentella (Herrich-Schäffer, 1855)
Ectoedemia louisella (Sircom, 1849)
Ectoedemia sericopeza (Zeller, 1839)
Ectoedemia septembrella (Stainton, 1849)
Ectoedemia amani Svensson, 1966
Ectoedemia atrifrontella (Stainton, 1851)
Ectoedemia liebwerdella Zimmermann, 1940
Ectoedemia longicaudella Klimesch, 1953
Enteucha acetosae (Stainton, 1854)
Parafomoria helianthemella (Herrich-Schäffer, 1860)
Simplimorpha promissa (Staudinger, 1871)
Stigmella aceris (Frey, 1857)
Stigmella aeneofasciella (Herrich-Schäffer, 1855)
Stigmella alnetella (Stainton, 1856)
Stigmella anomalella (Goeze, 1783)
Stigmella assimilella (Zeller, 1848)
Stigmella atricapitella (Haworth, 1828)
Stigmella aurella (Fabricius, 1775)
Stigmella basiguttella (Heinemann, 1862)
Stigmella benanderella (Wolff, 1955)
Stigmella betulicola (Stainton, 1856)
Stigmella carpinella (Heinemann, 1862)
Stigmella catharticella (Stainton, 1853)
Stigmella centifoliella (Zeller, 1848)
Stigmella confusella (Wood & Walsingham, 1894)
Stigmella continuella (Stainton, 1856)
Stigmella crataegella (Klimesch, 1936)
Stigmella desperatella (Frey, 1856)
Stigmella dorsiguttella (Johansson, 1971)
Stigmella eberhardi (Johansson, 1971)
Stigmella filipendulae (Wocke, 1871)
Stigmella floslactella (Haworth, 1828)
Stigmella freyella (Heyden, 1858)
Stigmella glutinosae (Stainton, 1858)
Stigmella hahniella (Worz, 1937)
Stigmella hemargyrella (Kollar, 1832)
Stigmella hybnerella (Hübner, 1796)
Stigmella incognitella (Herrich-Schäffer, 1855)
Stigmella lemniscella (Zeller, 1839)
Stigmella lonicerarum (Frey, 1856)
Stigmella luteella (Stainton, 1857)
Stigmella magdalenae (Klimesch, 1950)
Stigmella malella (Stainton, 1854)
Stigmella mespilicola (Frey, 1856)
Stigmella microtheriella (Stainton, 1854)
Stigmella minusculella (Herrich-Schäffer, 1855)
Stigmella naturnella (Klimesch, 1936)
Stigmella nivenburgensis (Preissecker, 1942)
Stigmella nylandriella (Tengstrom, 1848)
Stigmella obliquella (Heinemann, 1862)
Stigmella oxyacanthella (Stainton, 1854)
Stigmella paradoxa (Frey, 1858)
Stigmella perpygmaeella (Doubleday, 1859)
Stigmella plagicolella (Stainton, 1854)
Stigmella poterii (Stainton, 1857)
Stigmella prunetorum (Stainton, 1855)
Stigmella pyri (Glitz, 1865)
Stigmella regiella (Herrich-Schäffer, 1855)
Stigmella rhamnella (Herrich-Schäffer, 1860)
Stigmella roborella (Johansson, 1971)
Stigmella rolandi van Nieukerken, 1990
Stigmella sakhalinella Puplesis, 1984
Stigmella salicis (Stainton, 1854)
Stigmella samiatella (Zeller, 1839)
Stigmella sanguisorbae (Wocke, 1865)
Stigmella speciosa (Frey, 1858)
Stigmella splendidissimella (Herrich-Schäffer, 1855)
Stigmella svenssoni (Johansson, 1971)
Stigmella szoecsiella (Borkowski, 1972)
Stigmella thuringiaca (Petry, 1904)
Stigmella tiliae (Frey, 1856)
Stigmella tityrella (Stainton, 1854)
Stigmella tormentillella (Herrich-Schäffer, 1860)
Stigmella trimaculella (Haworth, 1828)
Stigmella ulmiphaga (Preissecker, 1942)
Stigmella ulmivora (Fologne, 1860)
Stigmella vimineticola (Frey, 1856)
Stigmella viscerella (Stainton, 1853)
Stigmella zangherii (Klimesch, 1951)
Trifurcula bleonella (Chretien, 1904)
Trifurcula headleyella (Stainton, 1854)
Trifurcula magna A. & Z. Lastuvka, 1997
Trifurcula melanoptera van Nieukerken & Puplesis, 1991
Trifurcula thymi (Szocs, 1965)
Trifurcula cryptella (Stainton, 1856)
Trifurcula eurema (Tutt, 1899)
Trifurcula ortneri (Klimesch, 1951)
Trifurcula beirnei Puplesis, 1984
Trifurcula chamaecytisi Z. & A. Lastuvka, 1994
Trifurcula josefklimeschi van Nieukerken, 1990
Trifurcula pallidella (Duponchel, 1843)

Noctuidae
Abrostola agnorista Dufay, 1956
Abrostola asclepiadis (Denis & Schiffermüller, 1775)
Abrostola tripartita (Hufnagel, 1766)
Abrostola triplasia (Linnaeus, 1758)
Acontia lucida (Hufnagel, 1766)
Acontia trabealis (Scopoli, 1763)
Acosmetia caliginosa (Hübner, 1813)
Acronicta aceris (Linnaeus, 1758)
Acronicta leporina (Linnaeus, 1758)
Acronicta strigosa (Denis & Schiffermüller, 1775)
Acronicta alni (Linnaeus, 1767)
Acronicta cuspis (Hübner, 1813)
Acronicta psi (Linnaeus, 1758)
Acronicta tridens (Denis & Schiffermüller, 1775)
Acronicta auricoma (Denis & Schiffermüller, 1775)
Acronicta euphorbiae (Denis & Schiffermüller, 1775)
Acronicta rumicis (Linnaeus, 1758)
Actebia praecox (Linnaeus, 1758)
Actebia fugax (Treitschke, 1825)
Actinotia polyodon (Clerck, 1759)
Actinotia radiosa (Esper, 1804)
Aedia funesta (Esper, 1786)
Aedia leucomelas (Linnaeus, 1758)
Aegle kaekeritziana (Hübner, 1799)
Agrochola lychnidis (Denis & Schiffermüller, 1775)
Agrochola helvola (Linnaeus, 1758)
Agrochola humilis (Denis & Schiffermüller, 1775)
Agrochola litura (Linnaeus, 1758)
Agrochola nitida (Denis & Schiffermüller, 1775)
Agrochola lota (Clerck, 1759)
Agrochola macilenta (Hübner, 1809)
Agrochola laevis (Hübner, 1803)
Agrochola circellaris (Hufnagel, 1766)
Agrotis bigramma (Esper, 1790)
Agrotis cinerea (Denis & Schiffermüller, 1775)
Agrotis clavis (Hufnagel, 1766)
Agrotis exclamationis (Linnaeus, 1758)
Agrotis ipsilon (Hufnagel, 1766)
Agrotis puta (Hübner, 1803)
Agrotis segetum (Denis & Schiffermüller, 1775)
Agrotis vestigialis (Hufnagel, 1766)
Allophyes oxyacanthae (Linnaeus, 1758)
Ammoconia caecimacula (Denis & Schiffermüller, 1775)
Amphipoea fucosa (Freyer, 1830)
Amphipoea lucens (Freyer, 1845)
Amphipoea oculea (Linnaeus, 1761)
Amphipyra berbera Rungs, 1949
Amphipyra livida (Denis & Schiffermüller, 1775)
Amphipyra perflua (Fabricius, 1787)
Amphipyra pyramidea (Linnaeus, 1758)
Amphipyra tetra (Fabricius, 1787)
Amphipyra tragopoginis (Clerck, 1759)
Amphipyra cinnamomea (Goeze, 1781)
Anaplectoides prasina (Denis & Schiffermüller, 1775)
Anarta myrtilli (Linnaeus, 1761)
Anarta dianthi (Tauscher, 1809)
Anarta trifolii (Hufnagel, 1766)
Anorthoa munda (Denis & Schiffermüller, 1775)
Antitype chi (Linnaeus, 1758)
Apamea anceps (Denis & Schiffermüller, 1775)
Apamea aquila Donzel, 1837
Apamea crenata (Hufnagel, 1766)
Apamea epomidion (Haworth, 1809)
Apamea furva (Denis & Schiffermüller, 1775)
Apamea illyria Freyer, 1846
Apamea lateritia (Hufnagel, 1766)
Apamea lithoxylaea (Denis & Schiffermüller, 1775)
Apamea monoglypha (Hufnagel, 1766)
Apamea oblonga (Haworth, 1809)
Apamea platinea (Treitschke, 1825)
Apamea remissa (Hübner, 1809)
Apamea rubrirena (Treitschke, 1825)
Apamea scolopacina (Esper, 1788)
Apamea sordens (Hufnagel, 1766)
Apamea sublustris (Esper, 1788)
Apamea syriaca (Osthelder, 1933)
Apamea unanimis (Hübner, 1813)
Apaustis rupicola (Denis & Schiffermüller, 1775)
Aporophyla lutulenta (Denis & Schiffermüller, 1775)
Apterogenum ypsillon (Denis & Schiffermüller, 1775)
Archanara dissoluta (Treitschke, 1825)
Archanara neurica (Hübner, 1808)
Arenostola phragmitidis (Hübner, 1803)
Asteroscopus sphinx (Hufnagel, 1766)
Asteroscopus syriaca (Warren, 1910)
Atethmia ambusta (Denis & Schiffermüller, 1775)
Atethmia centrago (Haworth, 1809)
Athetis furvula (Hübner, 1808)
Athetis gluteosa (Treitschke, 1835)
Athetis pallustris (Hübner, 1808)
Athetis lepigone (Moschler, 1860)
Atypha pulmonaris (Esper, 1790)
Auchmis detersa (Esper, 1787)
Autographa bractea (Denis & Schiffermüller, 1775)
Autographa buraetica (Staudinger, 1892)
Autographa gamma (Linnaeus, 1758)
Autographa jota (Linnaeus, 1758)
Autographa pulchrina (Haworth, 1809)
Axylia putris (Linnaeus, 1761)
Brachionycha nubeculosa (Esper, 1785)
Brachylomia viminalis (Fabricius, 1776)
Bryophila ereptricula Treitschke, 1825
Bryophila felina (Eversmann, 1852)
Bryophila raptricula (Denis & Schiffermüller, 1775)
Bryophila domestica (Hufnagel, 1766)
Calamia tridens (Hufnagel, 1766)
Calliergis ramosa (Esper, 1786)
Callopistria juventina (Stoll, 1782)
Callopistria latreillei (Duponchel, 1827)
Calophasia lunula (Hufnagel, 1766)
Calophasia opalina (Esper, 1793)
Calophasia platyptera (Esper, 1788)
Caradrina morpheus (Hufnagel, 1766)
Caradrina gilva (Donzel, 1837)
Caradrina clavipalpis Scopoli, 1763
Caradrina aspersa Rambur, 1834
Caradrina kadenii Freyer, 1836
Caradrina terrea Freyer, 1840
Ceramica pisi (Linnaeus, 1758)
Cerapteryx graminis (Linnaeus, 1758)
Cerastis leucographa (Denis & Schiffermüller, 1775)
Cerastis rubricosa (Denis & Schiffermüller, 1775)
Charanyca trigrammica (Hufnagel, 1766)
Charanyca ferruginea (Esper, 1785)
Chersotis cuprea (Denis & Schiffermüller, 1775)
Chersotis fimbriola (Esper, 1803)
Chersotis margaritacea (Villers, 1789)
Chersotis multangula (Hübner, 1803)
Chersotis rectangula (Denis & Schiffermüller, 1775)
Chilodes maritima (Tauscher, 1806)
Chloantha hyperici (Denis & Schiffermüller, 1775)
Chrysodeixis chalcites (Esper, 1789)
Cleoceris scoriacea (Esper, 1789)
Colocasia coryli (Linnaeus, 1758)
Conisania leineri (Freyer, 1836)
Conisania luteago (Denis & Schiffermüller, 1775)
Conistra ligula (Esper, 1791)
Conistra rubiginosa (Scopoli, 1763)
Conistra vaccinii (Linnaeus, 1761)
Conistra veronicae (Hübner, 1813)
Conistra erythrocephala (Denis & Schiffermüller, 1775)
Conistra rubiginea (Denis & Schiffermüller, 1775)
Cornutiplusia circumflexa (Linnaeus, 1767)
Cosmia trapezina (Linnaeus, 1758)
Cosmia diffinis (Linnaeus, 1767)
Cosmia pyralina (Denis & Schiffermüller, 1775)
Cosmia affinis (Linnaeus, 1767)
Craniophora ligustri (Denis & Schiffermüller, 1775)
Cryphia fraudatricula (Hübner, 1803)
Cryphia receptricula (Hübner, 1803)
Cryphia algae (Fabricius, 1775)
Crypsedra gemmea (Treitschke, 1825)
Cucullia absinthii (Linnaeus, 1761)
Cucullia argentea (Hufnagel, 1766)
Cucullia artemisiae (Hufnagel, 1766)
Cucullia asteris (Denis & Schiffermüller, 1775)
Cucullia balsamitae Boisduval, 1840
Cucullia campanulae Freyer, 1831
Cucullia chamomillae (Denis & Schiffermüller, 1775)
Cucullia dracunculi (Hübner, 1813)
Cucullia formosa Rogenhofer, 1860
Cucullia fraudatrix Eversmann, 1837
Cucullia gnaphalii (Hübner, 1813)
Cucullia lactucae (Denis & Schiffermüller, 1775)
Cucullia lucifuga (Denis & Schiffermüller, 1775)
Cucullia scopariae Dorfmeister, 1853
Cucullia tanaceti (Denis & Schiffermüller, 1775)
Cucullia umbratica (Linnaeus, 1758)
Cucullia xeranthemi Boisduval, 1840
Cucullia gozmanyi (G. Ronkay & L. Ronkay, 1994)
Cucullia lanceolata (Villers, 1789)
Cucullia lychnitis Rambur, 1833
Cucullia prenanthis Boisduval, 1840
Cucullia scrophulariae (Denis & Schiffermüller, 1775)
Cucullia verbasci (Linnaeus, 1758)
Deltote bankiana (Fabricius, 1775)
Deltote deceptoria (Scopoli, 1763)
Deltote uncula (Clerck, 1759)
Deltote pygarga (Hufnagel, 1766)
Denticucullus pygmina (Haworth, 1809)
Diachrysia chrysitis (Linnaeus, 1758)
Diachrysia chryson (Esper, 1789)
Diachrysia nadeja (Oberthür, 1880)
Diachrysia stenochrysis (Warren, 1913)
Diachrysia zosimi (Hübner, 1822)
Diarsia brunnea (Denis & Schiffermüller, 1775)
Diarsia dahlii (Hübner, 1813)
Diarsia florida (F. Schmidt, 1859)
Diarsia mendica (Fabricius, 1775)
Diarsia rubi (Vieweg, 1790)
Dichagyris flammatra (Denis & Schiffermüller, 1775)
Dichagyris musiva (Hübner, 1803)
Dichagyris candelisequa (Denis & Schiffermüller, 1775)
Dichagyris forcipula (Denis & Schiffermüller, 1775)
Dichagyris nigrescens (Hofner, 1888)
Dichagyris signifera (Denis & Schiffermüller, 1775)
Dichonia aeruginea (Hübner, 1808)
Dichonia convergens (Denis & Schiffermüller, 1775)
Dicycla oo (Linnaeus, 1758)
Diloba caeruleocephala (Linnaeus, 1758)
Dioszeghyana schmidti (Dioszeghy, 1935)
Divaena haywardi (Tams, 1926)
Dryobotodes eremita (Fabricius, 1775)
Dryobotodes monochroma (Esper, 1790)
Dryobotodes roboris (Geyer, 1835)
Dypterygia scabriuscula (Linnaeus, 1758)
Egira conspicillaris (Linnaeus, 1758)
Elaphria venustula (Hübner, 1790)
Enargia abluta (Hübner, 1808)
Enargia paleacea (Esper, 1788)
Epilecta linogrisea (Denis & Schiffermüller, 1775)
Epimecia ustula (Freyer, 1835)
Epipsilia latens (Hübner, 1809)
Episema glaucina (Esper, 1789)
Episema tersa (Denis & Schiffermüller, 1775)
Eremobia ochroleuca (Denis & Schiffermüller, 1775)
Eucarta amethystina (Hübner, 1803)
Eucarta virgo (Treitschke, 1835)
Euchalcia consona (Fabricius, 1787)
Euchalcia modestoides Poole, 1989
Euchalcia variabilis (Piller, 1783)
Eugnorisma depuncta (Linnaeus, 1761)
Eugraphe sigma (Denis & Schiffermüller, 1775)
Euplexia lucipara (Linnaeus, 1758)
Eupsilia transversa (Hufnagel, 1766)
Eurois occulta (Linnaeus, 1758)
Euxoa aquilina (Denis & Schiffermüller, 1775)
Euxoa birivia (Denis & Schiffermüller, 1775)
Euxoa decora (Denis & Schiffermüller, 1775)
Euxoa distinguenda (Lederer, 1857)
Euxoa eruta (Hübner, 1817)
Euxoa hastifera (Donzel, 1847)
Euxoa nigricans (Linnaeus, 1761)
Euxoa nigrofusca (Esper, 1788)
Euxoa obelisca (Denis & Schiffermüller, 1775)
Euxoa recussa (Hübner, 1817)
Euxoa segnilis (Duponchel, 1837)
Euxoa temera (Hübner, 1808)
Euxoa tritici (Linnaeus, 1761)
Euxoa vitta (Esper, 1789)
Fabula zollikoferi (Freyer, 1836)
Globia algae (Esper, 1789)
Globia sparganii (Esper, 1790)
Gortyna borelii Pierret, 1837
Gortyna flavago (Denis & Schiffermüller, 1775)
Graphiphora augur (Fabricius, 1775)
Griposia aprilina (Linnaeus, 1758)
Griposia wegneri Kobes & Fibiger, 2003
Hada plebeja (Linnaeus, 1761)
Hadena irregularis (Hufnagel, 1766)
Hadena perplexa (Denis & Schiffermüller, 1775)
Hadena silenes (Hübner, 1822)
Hadena albimacula (Borkhausen, 1792)
Hadena capsincola (Denis & Schiffermüller, 1775)
Hadena compta (Denis & Schiffermüller, 1775)
Hadena confusa (Hufnagel, 1766)
Hadena filograna (Esper, 1788)
Hadena magnolii (Boisduval, 1829)
Hecatera bicolorata (Hufnagel, 1766)
Hecatera cappa (Hübner, 1809)
Hecatera dysodea (Denis & Schiffermüller, 1775)
Helicoverpa armigera (Hübner, 1808)
Heliothis maritima Graslin, 1855
Heliothis nubigera Herrich-Schäffer, 1851
Heliothis ononis (Denis & Schiffermüller, 1775)
Heliothis peltigera (Denis & Schiffermüller, 1775)
Heliothis viriplaca (Hufnagel, 1766)
Helotropha leucostigma (Hübner, 1808)
Hoplodrina ambigua (Denis & Schiffermüller, 1775)
Hoplodrina blanda (Denis & Schiffermüller, 1775)
Hoplodrina octogenaria (Goeze, 1781)
Hoplodrina respersa (Denis & Schiffermüller, 1775)
Hoplodrina superstes (Ochsenheimer, 1816)
Hydraecia micacea (Esper, 1789)
Hydraecia petasitis Doubleday, 1847
Hydraecia ultima Holst, 1965
Hyppa rectilinea (Esper, 1788)
Hyssia cavernosa (Eversmann, 1842)
Ipimorpha retusa (Linnaeus, 1761)
Ipimorpha subtusa (Denis & Schiffermüller, 1775)
Jodia croceago (Denis & Schiffermüller, 1775)
Lacanobia contigua (Denis & Schiffermüller, 1775)
Lacanobia suasa (Denis & Schiffermüller, 1775)
Lacanobia thalassina (Hufnagel, 1766)
Lacanobia aliena (Hübner, 1809)
Lacanobia blenna (Hübner, 1824)
Lacanobia oleracea (Linnaeus, 1758)
Lacanobia splendens (Hübner, 1808)
Lacanobia w-latinum (Hufnagel, 1766)
Lamprosticta culta (Denis & Schiffermüller, 1775)
Lamprotes c-aureum (Knoch, 1781)
Lasionycta imbecilla (Fabricius, 1794)
Lasionycta proxima (Hübner, 1809)
Lateroligia ophiogramma (Esper, 1794)
Lenisa geminipuncta (Haworth, 1809)
Leucania loreyi (Duponchel, 1827)
Leucania comma (Linnaeus, 1761)
Leucania obsoleta (Hübner, 1803)
Lithophane consocia (Borkhausen, 1792)
Lithophane furcifera (Hufnagel, 1766)
Lithophane ornitopus (Hufnagel, 1766)
Lithophane semibrunnea (Haworth, 1809)
Lithophane socia (Hufnagel, 1766)
Litoligia literosa (Haworth, 1809)
Luperina testacea (Denis & Schiffermüller, 1775)
Lycophotia porphyrea (Denis & Schiffermüller, 1775)
Macdunnoughia confusa (Stephens, 1850)
Mamestra brassicae (Linnaeus, 1758)
Meganephria bimaculosa (Linnaeus, 1767)
Melanchra persicariae (Linnaeus, 1761)
Mesapamea secalella Remm, 1983
Mesapamea secalis (Linnaeus, 1758)
Mesogona acetosellae (Denis & Schiffermüller, 1775)
Mesogona oxalina (Hübner, 1803)
Mesoligia furuncula (Denis & Schiffermüller, 1775)
Mesotrosta signalis (Treitschke, 1829)
Mniotype adusta (Esper, 1790)
Mniotype satura (Denis & Schiffermüller, 1775)
Moma alpium (Osbeck, 1778)
Mormo maura (Linnaeus, 1758)
Mythimna albipuncta (Denis & Schiffermüller, 1775)
Mythimna ferrago (Fabricius, 1787)
Mythimna l-album (Linnaeus, 1767)
Mythimna conigera (Denis & Schiffermüller, 1775)
Mythimna impura (Hübner, 1808)
Mythimna pallens (Linnaeus, 1758)
Mythimna pudorina (Denis & Schiffermüller, 1775)
Mythimna straminea (Treitschke, 1825)
Mythimna turca (Linnaeus, 1761)
Mythimna vitellina (Hübner, 1808)
Mythimna unipuncta (Haworth, 1809)
Naenia typica (Linnaeus, 1758)
Noctua comes Hübner, 1813
Noctua fimbriata (Schreber, 1759)
Noctua interjecta Hübner, 1803
Noctua interposita (Hübner, 1790)
Noctua janthe (Borkhausen, 1792)
Noctua janthina Denis & Schiffermüller, 1775
Noctua orbona (Hufnagel, 1766)
Noctua pronuba (Linnaeus, 1758)
Nonagria typhae (Thunberg, 1784)
Nyctobrya muralis (Forster, 1771)
Ochropleura leucogaster (Freyer, 1831)
Ochropleura plecta (Linnaeus, 1761)
Oligia dubia (Heydemann, 1942)
Oligia fasciuncula (Haworth, 1809)
Oligia latruncula (Denis & Schiffermüller, 1775)
Oligia strigilis (Linnaeus, 1758)
Oligia versicolor (Borkhausen, 1792)
Omphalophana antirrhinii (Hübner, 1803)
Opigena polygona (Denis & Schiffermüller, 1775)
Orbona fragariae Vieweg, 1790
Oria musculosa (Hübner, 1808)
Orthosia gracilis (Denis & Schiffermüller, 1775)
Orthosia opima (Hübner, 1809)
Orthosia cerasi (Fabricius, 1775)
Orthosia cruda (Denis & Schiffermüller, 1775)
Orthosia miniosa (Denis & Schiffermüller, 1775)
Orthosia populeti (Fabricius, 1775)
Orthosia incerta (Hufnagel, 1766)
Orthosia gothica (Linnaeus, 1758)
Oxicesta geographica (Fabricius, 1787)
Oxytripia orbiculosa (Esper, 1799)
Pabulatrix pabulatricula (Brahm, 1791)
Pachetra sagittigera (Hufnagel, 1766)
Panchrysia aurea (Hübner, 1803)
Panemeria tenebrata (Scopoli, 1763)
Panolis flammea (Denis & Schiffermüller, 1775)
Panthea coenobita (Esper, 1785)
Parastichtis suspecta (Hübner, 1817)
Peridroma saucia (Hübner, 1808)
Perigrapha i-cinctum (Denis & Schiffermüller, 1775)
Periphanes delphinii (Linnaeus, 1758)
Phlogophora meticulosa (Linnaeus, 1758)
Phlogophora scita (Hübner, 1790)
Photedes captiuncula (Treitschke, 1825)
Photedes extrema (Hübner, 1809)
Photedes fluxa (Hübner, 1809)
Photedes minima (Haworth, 1809)
Photedes morrisii (Dale, 1837)
Phragmatiphila nexa (Hübner, 1808)
Phyllophila obliterata (Rambur, 1833)
Plusia festucae (Linnaeus, 1758)
Polia bombycina (Hufnagel, 1766)
Polia hepatica (Clerck, 1759)
Polia nebulosa (Hufnagel, 1766)
Polychrysia moneta (Fabricius, 1787)
Polymixis polymita (Linnaeus, 1761)
Polymixis rufocincta (Geyer, 1828)
Polymixis xanthomista (Hübner, 1819)
Polyphaenis sericata (Esper, 1787)
Protolampra sobrina (Duponchel, 1843)
Protoschinia scutosa (Denis & Schiffermüller, 1775)
Pseudeustrotia candidula (Denis & Schiffermüller, 1775)
Pyrrhia purpura (Hübner, 1817)
Pyrrhia umbra (Hufnagel, 1766)
Rhizedra lutosa (Hübner, 1803)
Rhyacia lucipeta (Denis & Schiffermüller, 1775)
Rhyacia simulans (Hufnagel, 1766)
Rileyiana fovea (Treitschke, 1825)
Saragossa porosa (Eversmann, 1854)
Schinia cardui (Hübner, 1790)
Schinia cognata (Freyer, 1833)
Scotochrosta pulla (Denis & Schiffermüller, 1775)
Sedina buettneri (E. Hering, 1858)
Senta flammea (Curtis, 1828)
Sideridis rivularis (Fabricius, 1775)
Sideridis implexa (Hübner, 1809)
Sideridis reticulata (Goeze, 1781)
Sideridis lampra (Schawerda, 1913)
Sideridis turbida (Esper, 1790)
Simyra albovenosa (Goeze, 1781)
Simyra nervosa (Denis & Schiffermüller, 1775)
Spaelotis ravida (Denis & Schiffermüller, 1775)
Spodoptera exigua (Hübner, 1808)
Staurophora celsia (Linnaeus, 1758)
Subacronicta megacephala (Denis & Schiffermüller, 1775)
Syngrapha ain (Hochenwarth, 1785)
Syngrapha interrogationis (Linnaeus, 1758)
Thalpophila matura (Hufnagel, 1766)
Tholera cespitis (Denis & Schiffermüller, 1775)
Tholera decimalis (Poda, 1761)
Tiliacea aurago (Denis & Schiffermüller, 1775)
Tiliacea citrago (Linnaeus, 1758)
Tiliacea sulphurago (Denis & Schiffermüller, 1775)
Trachea atriplicis (Linnaeus, 1758)
Trichoplusia ni (Hübner, 1803)
Tyta luctuosa (Denis & Schiffermüller, 1775)
Valeria oleagina (Denis & Schiffermüller, 1775)
Xanthia gilvago (Denis & Schiffermüller, 1775)
Xanthia icteritia (Hufnagel, 1766)
Xanthia ocellaris (Borkhausen, 1792)
Xanthia ruticilla (Esper, 1791)
Xanthia togata (Esper, 1788)
Xestia ashworthii (Doubleday, 1855)
Xestia c-nigrum (Linnaeus, 1758)
Xestia ditrapezium (Denis & Schiffermüller, 1775)
Xestia triangulum (Hufnagel, 1766)
Xestia baja (Denis & Schiffermüller, 1775)
Xestia castanea (Esper, 1798)
Xestia collina (Boisduval, 1840)
Xestia sexstrigata (Haworth, 1809)
Xestia stigmatica (Hübner, 1813)
Xestia xanthographa (Denis & Schiffermüller, 1775)
Xylena exsoleta (Linnaeus, 1758)
Xylena vetusta (Hübner, 1813)

Nolidae
Bena bicolorana (Fuessly, 1775)
Earias clorana (Linnaeus, 1761)
Earias vernana (Fabricius, 1787)
Meganola albula (Denis & Schiffermüller, 1775)
Meganola strigula (Denis & Schiffermüller, 1775)
Meganola togatulalis (Hübner, 1796)
Nola aerugula (Hübner, 1793)
Nola chlamitulalis (Hübner, 1813)
Nola cicatricalis (Treitschke, 1835)
Nola confusalis (Herrich-Schäffer, 1847)
Nola cristatula (Hübner, 1793)
Nola cucullatella (Linnaeus, 1758)
Nycteola asiatica (Krulikovsky, 1904)
Nycteola degenerana (Hübner, 1799)
Nycteola revayana (Scopoli, 1772)
Nycteola siculana (Fuchs, 1899)
Pseudoips prasinana (Linnaeus, 1758)

Notodontidae
Cerura erminea (Esper, 1783)
Cerura vinula (Linnaeus, 1758)
Clostera anachoreta (Denis & Schiffermüller, 1775)
Clostera anastomosis (Linnaeus, 1758)
Clostera curtula (Linnaeus, 1758)
Clostera pigra (Hufnagel, 1766)
Dicranura ulmi (Denis & Schiffermüller, 1775)
Drymonia dodonaea (Denis & Schiffermüller, 1775)
Drymonia obliterata (Esper, 1785)
Drymonia querna (Denis & Schiffermüller, 1775)
Drymonia ruficornis (Hufnagel, 1766)
Drymonia velitaris (Hufnagel, 1766)
Furcula bicuspis (Borkhausen, 1790)
Furcula bifida (Brahm, 1787)
Furcula furcula (Clerck, 1759)
Gluphisia crenata (Esper, 1785)
Harpyia milhauseri (Fabricius, 1775)
Leucodonta bicoloria (Denis & Schiffermüller, 1775)
Notodonta dromedarius (Linnaeus, 1767)
Notodonta torva (Hübner, 1803)
Notodonta tritophus (Denis & Schiffermüller, 1775)
Notodonta ziczac (Linnaeus, 1758)
Odontosia carmelita (Esper, 1799)
Peridea anceps (Goeze, 1781)
Phalera bucephala (Linnaeus, 1758)
Phalera bucephaloides (Ochsenheimer, 1810)
Pheosia gnoma (Fabricius, 1776)
Pheosia tremula (Clerck, 1759)
Pterostoma palpina (Clerck, 1759)
Ptilodon capucina (Linnaeus, 1758)
Ptilodon cucullina (Denis & Schiffermüller, 1775)
Ptilophora plumigera (Denis & Schiffermüller, 1775)
Spatalia argentina (Denis & Schiffermüller, 1775)
Stauropus fagi (Linnaeus, 1758)
Thaumetopoea processionea (Linnaeus, 1758)

Oecophoridae
Alabonia staintoniella (Zeller, 1850)
Batia internella Jackh, 1972
Batia lambdella (Donovan, 1793)
Bisigna procerella (Denis & Schiffermüller, 1775)
Borkhausenia fuscescens (Haworth, 1828)
Borkhausenia minutella (Linnaeus, 1758)
Crassa tinctella (Hübner, 1796)
Crassa unitella (Hübner, 1796)
Dasycera krueperella Staudinger, 1870
Dasycera oliviella (Fabricius, 1794)
Decantha borkhausenii (Zeller, 1839)
Denisia augustella (Hübner, 1796)
Denisia similella (Hübner, 1796)
Denisia stipella (Linnaeus, 1758)
Denisia stroemella (Fabricius, 1779)
Deuterogonia pudorina (Wocke, 1857)
Endrosis sarcitrella (Linnaeus, 1758)
Epicallima bruandella (Ragonot, 1889)
Epicallima formosella (Denis & Schiffermüller, 1775)
Fabiola pokornyi (Nickerl, 1864)
Harpella forficella (Scopoli, 1763)
Hofmannophila pseudospretella (Stainton, 1849)
Holoscolia huebneri Kocak, 1980
Kasyniana diminutella (Rebel, 1931)
Metalampra cinnamomea (Zeller, 1839)
Minetia adamczewskii (Toll, 1956)
Minetia criella (Treitschke, 1835)
Minetia crinitus (Fabricius, 1798)
Minetia labiosella (Hübner, 1810)
Oecophora bractella (Linnaeus, 1758)
Pleurota marginella (Denis & Schiffermüller, 1775)
Pleurota aristella (Linnaeus, 1767)
Pleurota bicostella (Clerck, 1759)
Pleurota brevispinella (Zeller, 1847)
Pleurota pungitiella Herrich-Schäffer, 1854
Pleurota pyropella (Denis & Schiffermüller, 1775)
Schiffermuelleria schaefferella (Linnaeus, 1758)
Schiffermuelleria grandis (Desvignes, 1842)

Opostegidae
Opostega salaciella (Treitschke, 1833)
Opostega spatulella Herrich-Schäffer, 1855
Pseudopostega auritella (Hübner, 1813)
Pseudopostega crepusculella (Zeller, 1839)

Peleopodidae
Carcina quercana (Fabricius, 1775)

Plutellidae
Eidophasia messingiella (Fischer von Röslerstamm, 1840)
Eidophasia syenitella Herrich-Schäffer, 1854
Plutella xylostella (Linnaeus, 1758)
Plutella porrectella (Linnaeus, 1758)
Rhigognostis hufnagelii (Zeller, 1839)
Rhigognostis incarnatella (Steudel, 1873)
Rhigognostis kovacsi (Gozmany, 1952)
Rhigognostis senilella (Zetterstedt, 1839)

Praydidae
Atemelia torquatella (Lienig & Zeller, 1846)
Prays fraxinella (Bjerkander, 1784)
Prays ruficeps (Heinemann, 1854)

Prodoxidae
Lampronia corticella (Linnaeus, 1758)
Lampronia flavimitrella (Hübner, 1817)
Lampronia fuscatella (Tengstrom, 1848)
Lampronia morosa Zeller, 1852
Lampronia pubicornis (Haworth, 1828)
Lampronia rupella (Denis & Schiffermüller, 1775)

Psychidae
Acanthopsyche atra (Linnaeus, 1767)
Acanthopsyche ecksteini (Lederer, 1855)
Acanthopsyche siederi Szocs, 1961
Acentra subvestalis (Wehrli, 1933)
Anaproutia comitella (Bruand, 1853)
Apterona helicoidella (Vallot, 1827)
Bacotia claustrella (Bruand, 1845)
Bijugis bombycella (Denis & Schiffermüller, 1775)
Bijugis pectinella (Denis & Schiffermüller, 1775)
Brevantennia herrmanni Weidlich, 1996
Canephora hirsuta (Poda, 1761)
Dahlica lichenella (Linnaeus, 1761)
Dahlica nickerlii (Heinemann, 1870)
Dahlica triquetrella (Hübner, 1813)
Diplodoma adspersella Heinemann, 1870
Diplodoma laichartingella Goeze, 1783
Eosolenobia manni Zeller, 1852
Epichnopterix kovacsi Sieder, 1955
Epichnopterix plumella (Denis & Schiffermüller, 1775)
Megalophanes viciella (Denis & Schiffermüller, 1775)
Narycia astrella (Herrich-Schäffer, 1851)
Narycia duplicella (Goeze, 1783)
Oiketicoides lutea (Staudinger, 1870)
Pachythelia villosella (Ochsenheimer, 1810)
Postsolenobia banatica (M. Hering, 1922)
Praesolenobia clathrella Fischer v. Röslerstamm, 1837
Proutia betulina (Zeller, 1839)
Psyche casta (Pallas, 1767)
Psyche crassiorella Bruand, 1851
Psychidea nudella (Ochsenheimer, 1810)
Ptilocephala muscella (Denis & Schiffermüller, 1775)
Ptilocephala plumifera (Ochsenheimer, 1810)
Rebelia herrichiella Strand, 1912
Rebelia sapho (Milliere, 1864)
Rebelia surientella (Bruand, 1858)
Siederia listerella (Linnaeus, 1758)
Sterrhopterix fusca (Haworth, 1809)
Taleporia politella (Ochsenheimer, 1816)
Taleporia tubulosa (Retzius, 1783)
Whittleia undulella (Fischer v. Röslerstamm, 1837)

Pterolonchidae
Pterolonche albescens Zeller, 1847
Pterolonche inspersa Staudinger, 1859

Pterophoridae
Adaina microdactyla (Hübner, 1813)
Agdistis adactyla (Hübner, 1819)
Agdistis heydeni (Zeller, 1852)
Agdistis intermedia Caradja, 1920
Agdistis tamaricis (Zeller, 1847)
Amblyptilia acanthadactyla (Hübner, 1813)
Amblyptilia punctidactyla (Haworth, 1811)
Buszkoiana capnodactylus (Zeller, 1841)
Calyciphora albodactylus (Fabricius, 1794)
Calyciphora nephelodactyla (Eversmann, 1844)
Calyciphora xanthodactyla (Treitschke, 1833)
Capperia celeusi (Frey, 1886)
Capperia fusca (O. Hofmann, 1898)
Capperia trichodactyla (Denis & Schiffermüller, 1775)
Cnaemidophorus rhododactyla (Denis & Schiffermüller, 1775)
Crombrugghia distans (Zeller, 1847)
Crombrugghia tristis (Zeller, 1841)
Emmelina argoteles (Meyrick, 1922)
Emmelina monodactyla (Linnaeus, 1758)
Geina didactyla (Linnaeus, 1758)
Gillmeria miantodactylus (Zeller, 1841)
Gillmeria ochrodactyla (Denis & Schiffermüller, 1775)
Gillmeria pallidactyla (Haworth, 1811)
Hellinsia carphodactyla (Hübner, 1813)
Hellinsia didactylites (Strom, 1783)
Hellinsia distinctus (Herrich-Schäffer, 1855)
Hellinsia inulae (Zeller, 1852)
Hellinsia lienigianus (Zeller, 1852)
Hellinsia osteodactylus (Zeller, 1841)
Hellinsia tephradactyla (Hübner, 1813)
Marasmarcha lunaedactyla (Haworth, 1811)
Merrifieldia baliodactylus (Zeller, 1841)
Merrifieldia leucodactyla (Denis & Schiffermüller, 1775)
Merrifieldia malacodactylus (Zeller, 1847)
Merrifieldia tridactyla (Linnaeus, 1758)
Oidaematophorus constanti Ragonot, 1875
Oidaematophorus lithodactyla (Treitschke, 1833)
Oxyptilus chrysodactyla (Denis & Schiffermüller, 1775)
Oxyptilus parvidactyla (Haworth, 1811)
Oxyptilus pilosellae (Zeller, 1841)
Platyptilia farfarellus Zeller, 1867
Platyptilia gonodactyla (Denis & Schiffermüller, 1775)
Platyptilia nemoralis Zeller, 1841
Platyptilia tesseradactyla (Linnaeus, 1761)
Porrittia galactodactyla (Denis & Schiffermüller, 1775)
Pselnophorus heterodactyla (Muller, 1764)
Pterophorus ischnodactyla (Treitschke, 1835)
Pterophorus pentadactyla (Linnaeus, 1758)
Stangeia siceliota (Zeller, 1847)
Stenoptilia annadactyla Sutter, 1988
Stenoptilia bipunctidactyla (Scopoli, 1763)
Stenoptilia coprodactylus (Stainton, 1851)
Stenoptilia gratiolae Gibeaux & Nel, 1990
Stenoptilia pelidnodactyla (Stein, 1837)
Stenoptilia pneumonanthes (Buttner, 1880)
Stenoptilia pterodactyla (Linnaeus, 1761)
Stenoptilia stigmatodactylus (Zeller, 1852)
Stenoptilia stigmatoides Sutter & Skyva, 1992
Stenoptilia zophodactylus (Duponchel, 1840)
Wheeleria obsoletus (Zeller, 1841)

Pyralidae
Achroia grisella (Fabricius, 1794)
Acrobasis advenella (Zincken, 1818)
Acrobasis consociella (Hübner, 1813)
Acrobasis dulcella (Zeller, 1848)
Acrobasis glaucella Staudinger, 1859
Acrobasis legatea (Haworth, 1811)
Acrobasis marmorea (Haworth, 1811)
Acrobasis obtusella (Hübner, 1796)
Acrobasis repandana (Fabricius, 1798)
Acrobasis sodalella Zeller, 1848
Acrobasis suavella (Zincken, 1818)
Acrobasis tumidana (Denis & Schiffermüller, 1775)
Aglossa caprealis (Hübner, 1809)
Aglossa pinguinalis (Linnaeus, 1758)
Aglossa signicostalis Staudinger, 1871
Alophia combustella (Herrich-Schäffer, 1855)
Ancylosis albidella Ragonot, 1888
Ancylosis cinnamomella (Duponchel, 1836)
Ancylosis deserticola (Staudinger, 1870)
Ancylosis oblitella (Zeller, 1848)
Ancylosis roscidella (Eversmann, 1844)
Ancylosis sareptalla (Herrich-Schäffer, 1861)
Anerastia dubia Gerasimov, 1929
Anerastia lotella (Hübner, 1813)
Aphomia foedella (Zeller, 1839)
Aphomia sociella (Linnaeus, 1758)
Aphomia zelleri de Joannis, 1932
Apomyelois bistriatella (Hulst, 1887)
Apomyelois ceratoniae (Zeller, 1839)
Asalebria geminella (Eversmann, 1844)
Assara terebrella (Zincken, 1818)
Cadra cautella (Walker, 1863)
Cadra figulilella (Gregson, 1871)
Cadra furcatella (Herrich-Schäffer, 1849)
Catastia marginea (Denis & Schiffermüller, 1775)
Cryptoblabes bistriga (Haworth, 1811)
Delplanqueia dilutella (Denis & Schiffermüller, 1775)
Dioryctria abietella (Denis & Schiffermüller, 1775)
Dioryctria schuetzeella Fuchs, 1899
Dioryctria simplicella Heinemann, 1863
Dioryctria sylvestrella (Ratzeburg, 1840)
Eccopisa effractella Zeller, 1848
Ectohomoeosoma kasyellum Roesler, 1965
Elegia fallax (Staudinger, 1881)
Elegia similella (Zincken, 1818)
Ematheudes punctella (Treitschke, 1833)
Endotricha flammealis (Denis & Schiffermüller, 1775)
Ephestia elutella (Hübner, 1796)
Ephestia kuehniella Zeller, 1879
Ephestia unicolorella Staudinger, 1881
Ephestia welseriella (Zeller, 1848)
Epischnia prodromella (Hübner, 1799)
Episcythrastis tetricella (Denis & Schiffermüller, 1775)
Etiella zinckenella (Treitschke, 1832)
Eucarphia vinetella (Fabricius, 1787)
Eurhodope cirrigerella (Zincken, 1818)
Eurhodope rosella (Scopoli, 1763)
Euzophera bigella (Zeller, 1848)
Euzophera cinerosella (Zeller, 1839)
Euzophera fuliginosella (Heinemann, 1865)
Euzophera pinguis (Haworth, 1811)
Euzopherodes charlottae (Rebel, 1914)
Euzopherodes vapidella (Mann, 1857)
Galleria mellonella (Linnaeus, 1758)
Glyptoteles leucacrinella Zeller, 1848
Gymnancyla canella (Denis & Schiffermüller, 1775)
Gymnancyla hornigii (Lederer, 1852)
Homoeosoma inustella Ragonot, 1884
Homoeosoma nebulella (Denis & Schiffermüller, 1775)
Homoeosoma nimbella (Duponchel, 1837)
Homoeosoma sinuella (Fabricius, 1794)
Hypochalcia ahenella (Denis & Schiffermüller, 1775)
Hypochalcia decorella (Hübner, 1810)
Hypochalcia dignella (Hübner, 1796)
Hypochalcia lignella (Hübner, 1796)
Hypochalcia propinquella (Guenee, 1845)
Hyporatasa allotriella (Herrich-Schäffer, 1855)
Hypotia massilialis (Duponchel, 1832)
Hypsopygia costalis (Fabricius, 1775)
Hypsopygia fulvocilialis (Duponchel, 1834)
Hypsopygia glaucinalis (Linnaeus, 1758)
Hypsopygia incarnatalis (Zeller, 1847)
Hypsopygia rubidalis (Denis & Schiffermüller, 1775)
Hypsotropa unipunctella Ragonot, 1888
Insalebria serraticornella (Zeller, 1839)
Isauria dilucidella (Duponchel, 1836)
Khorassania compositella (Treitschke, 1835)
Lamoria anella (Denis & Schiffermüller, 1775)
Laodamia faecella (Zeller, 1839)
Matilella fusca (Haworth, 1811)
Moitrelia obductella (Zeller, 1839)
Myelois circumvoluta (Fourcroy, 1785)
Nephopterix angustella (Hübner, 1796)
Nyctegretis lineana (Scopoli, 1786)
Nyctegretis triangulella Ragonot, 1901
Oncocera semirubella (Scopoli, 1763)
Ortholepis betulae (Goeze, 1778)
Paralipsa gularis (Zeller, 1877)
Pempelia albariella Zeller, 1839
Pempelia palumbella (Denis & Schiffermüller, 1775)
Pempeliella ornatella (Denis & Schiffermüller, 1775)
Pempeliella sororiella Zeller, 1839
Phycita meliella (Mann, 1864)
Phycita metzneri (Zeller, 1846)
Phycita roborella (Denis & Schiffermüller, 1775)
Phycitodes albatella (Ragonot, 1887)
Phycitodes binaevella (Hübner, 1813)
Phycitodes inquinatella (Ragonot, 1887)
Phycitodes lacteella (Rothschild, 1915)
Phycitodes maritima (Tengstrom, 1848)
Phycitodes saxicola (Vaughan, 1870)
Pima boisduvaliella (Guenee, 1845)
Plodia interpunctella (Hübner, 1813)
Psorosa dahliella (Treitschke, 1832)
Pterothrixidia rufella (Duponchel, 1836)
Pyralis farinalis (Linnaeus, 1758)
Pyralis perversalis (Herrich-Schäffer, 1849)
Pyralis regalis Denis & Schiffermüller, 1775
Rhodophaea formosa (Haworth, 1811)
Salebriopsis albicilla (Herrich-Schäffer, 1849)
Sciota adelphella (Fischer v. Röslerstamm, 1836)
Sciota fumella (Eversmann, 1844)
Sciota hostilis (Stephens, 1834)
Sciota rhenella (Zincken, 1818)
Selagia argyrella (Denis & Schiffermüller, 1775)
Selagia spadicella (Hübner, 1796)
Stemmatophora brunnealis (Treitschke, 1829)
Stemmatophora honestalis (Treitschke, 1829)
Synaphe antennalis (Fabricius, 1794)
Synaphe bombycalis (Denis & Schiffermüller, 1775)
Synaphe moldavica (Esper, 1794)
Synaphe punctalis (Fabricius, 1775)
Trachonitis cristella (Denis & Schiffermüller, 1775)
Vitula biviella (Zeller, 1848)

Roeslerstammiidae
Roeslerstammia erxlebella (Fabricius, 1787)
Roeslerstammia pronubella (Denis & Schiffermüller, 1775)

Saturniidae
Aglia tau (Linnaeus, 1758)
Antheraea yamamai (Guerin-Meneville, 1861)
Saturnia spini (Denis & Schiffermüller, 1775)
Saturnia pyri (Denis & Schiffermüller, 1775)

Schreckensteiniidae
Schreckensteinia festaliella (Hübner, 1819)

Scythrididae
Parascythris muelleri (Mann, 1871)
Scythris aerariella (Herrich-Schäffer, 1855)
Scythris apicistrigella (Staudinger, 1870)
Scythris bengtssoni Patocka & Liska, 1989
Scythris bifissella (O. Hofmann, 1889)
Scythris crassiuscula (Herrich-Schäffer, 1855)
Scythris cuspidella (Denis & Schiffermüller, 1775)
Scythris emichi (Anker, 1870)
Scythris fallacella (Schlager, 1847)
Scythris flaviventrella (Herrich-Schäffer, 1855)
Scythris fuscoaenea (Haworth, 1828)
Scythris gozmanyi Passerin d'Entreves, 1986
Scythris hungaricella Rebel, 1917
Scythris knochella (Fabricius, 1794)
Scythris laminella (Denis & Schiffermüller, 1775)
Scythris limbella (Fabricius, 1775)
Scythris obscurella (Scopoli, 1763)
Scythris palustris (Zeller, 1855)
Scythris pascuella (Zeller, 1855)
Scythris paullella (Herrich-Schäffer, 1855)
Scythris picaepennis (Haworth, 1828)
Scythris podoliensis Rebel, 1938
Scythris productella (Zeller, 1839)
Scythris punctivittella (O. Costa, 1836)
Scythris seliniella (Zeller, 1839)
Scythris siccella (Zeller, 1839)
Scythris sinensis (Felder & Rogenhofer, 1875)
Scythris subseliniella (Heinemann, 1876)
Scythris tabidella (Herrich-Schäffer, 1855)
Scythris tributella (Zeller, 1847)
Scythris vittella (O. Costa, 1834)

Sesiidae
Bembecia albanensis (Rebel, 1918)
Bembecia ichneumoniformis (Denis & Schiffermüller, 1775)
Bembecia megillaeformis (Hübner, 1813)
Bembecia puella Z. Lastuvka, 1989
Bembecia scopigera (Scopoli, 1763)
Bembecia uroceriformis (Treitschke, 1834)
Chamaesphecia anatolica Schwingenschuss, 1938
Chamaesphecia annellata (Zeller, 1847)
Chamaesphecia astatiformis (Herrich-Schäffer, 1846)
Chamaesphecia bibioniformis (Esper, 1800)
Chamaesphecia chalciformis (Esper, 1804)
Chamaesphecia crassicornis Bartel, 1912
Chamaesphecia doleriformis (Herrich-Schäffer, 1846)
Chamaesphecia dumonti Le Cerf, 1922
Chamaesphecia empiformis (Esper, 1783)
Chamaesphecia euceraeformis (Ochsenheimer, 1816)
Chamaesphecia hungarica (Tomala, 1901)
Chamaesphecia leucopsiformis (Esper, 1800)
Chamaesphecia masariformis (Ochsenheimer, 1808)
Chamaesphecia nigrifrons (Le Cerf, 1911)
Chamaesphecia palustris Kautz, 1927
Chamaesphecia tenthrediniformis (Denis & Schiffermüller, 1775)
Paranthrene insolitus Le Cerf, 1914
Paranthrene tabaniformis (Rottemburg, 1775)
Pennisetia hylaeiformis (Laspeyres, 1801)
Pyropteron affinis (Staudinger, 1856)
Pyropteron muscaeformis (Esper, 1783)
Pyropteron triannuliformis (Freyer, 1843)
Sesia apiformis (Clerck, 1759)
Sesia melanocephala Dalman, 1816
Synanthedon andrenaeformis (Laspeyres, 1801)
Synanthedon conopiformis (Esper, 1782)
Synanthedon culiciformis (Linnaeus, 1758)
Synanthedon flaviventris (Staudinger, 1883)
Synanthedon formicaeformis (Esper, 1783)
Synanthedon loranthi (Kralicek, 1966)
Synanthedon melliniformis (Laspeyres, 1801)
Synanthedon mesiaeformis (Herrich-Schäffer, 1846)
Synanthedon myopaeformis (Borkhausen, 1789)
Synanthedon scoliaeformis (Borkhausen, 1789)
Synanthedon spheciformis (Denis & Schiffermüller, 1775)
Synanthedon spuleri (Fuchs, 1908)
Synanthedon stomoxiformis (Hübner, 1790)
Synanthedon tipuliformis (Clerck, 1759)
Synanthedon vespiformis (Linnaeus, 1761)
Tinthia brosiformis (Hübner, 1813)

Sphingidae
Acherontia atropos (Linnaeus, 1758)
Agrius convolvuli (Linnaeus, 1758)
Daphnis nerii (Linnaeus, 1758)
Deilephila elpenor (Linnaeus, 1758)
Deilephila porcellus (Linnaeus, 1758)
Hemaris fuciformis (Linnaeus, 1758)
Hemaris tityus (Linnaeus, 1758)
Hippotion celerio (Linnaeus, 1758)
Hyles euphorbiae (Linnaeus, 1758)
Hyles gallii (Rottemburg, 1775)
Hyles livornica (Esper, 1780)
Hyles vespertilio (Esper, 1780)
Laothoe populi (Linnaeus, 1758)
Macroglossum stellatarum (Linnaeus, 1758)
Marumba quercus (Denis & Schiffermüller, 1775)
Mimas tiliae (Linnaeus, 1758)
Proserpinus proserpina (Pallas, 1772)
Smerinthus ocellata (Linnaeus, 1758)
Sphinx ligustri Linnaeus, 1758
Sphinx pinastri Linnaeus, 1758

Stathmopodidae
Stathmopoda pedella (Linnaeus, 1761)

Thyrididae
Thyris fenestrella (Scopoli, 1763)

Tineidae
Archinemapogon yildizae Kocak, 1981
Ateliotum hungaricellum Zeller, 1839
Cephimallota angusticostella (Zeller, 1839)
Elatobia fuliginosella (Lienig & Zeller, 1846)
Eudarcia pagenstecherella (Hübner, 1825)
Euplocamus anthracinalis (Scopoli, 1763)
Haplotinea ditella (Pierce & Metcalfe, 1938)
Haplotinea insectella (Fabricius, 1794)
Infurcitinea albicomella (Stainton, 1851)
Infurcitinea argentimaculella (Stainton, 1849)
Infurcitinea finalis Gozmany, 1959
Infurcitinea roesslerella (Heyden, 1865)
Matratinea rufulicaput Sziraki & Szocs, 1990
Monopis crocicapitella (Clemens, 1859)
Monopis fenestratella (Heyden, 1863)
Monopis imella (Hübner, 1813)
Monopis laevigella (Denis & Schiffermüller, 1775)
Monopis monachella (Hübner, 1796)
Monopis obviella (Denis & Schiffermüller, 1775)
Monopis weaverella (Scott, 1858)
Montescardia tessulatellus (Zeller, 1846)
Morophaga choragella (Denis & Schiffermüller, 1775)
Myrmecozela ochraceella (Tengstrom, 1848)
Nemapogon clematella (Fabricius, 1781)
Nemapogon cloacella (Haworth, 1828)
Nemapogon falstriella (Bang-Haas, 1881)
Nemapogon granella (Linnaeus, 1758)
Nemapogon gravosaellus Petersen, 1957
Nemapogon hungaricus Gozmany, 1960
Nemapogon inconditella (Lucas, 1956)
Nemapogon nigralbella (Zeller, 1839)
Nemapogon picarella (Clerck, 1759)
Nemapogon variatella (Clemens, 1859)
Nemapogon wolffiella Karsholt & Nielsen, 1976
Nemaxera betulinella (Fabricius, 1787)
Neurothaumasia ankerella (Mann, 1867)
Niditinea fuscella (Linnaeus, 1758)
Niditinea striolella (Matsumura, 1931)
Oinophila v-flava (Haworth, 1828)
Opogona sacchari (Bojer, 1856)
Psychoides verhuella Bruand, 1853
Reisserita relicinella (Herrich-Schäffer, 1853)
Scardia boletella (Fabricius, 1794)
Stenoptinea cyaneimarmorella (Milliere, 1854)
Tinea columbariella Wocke, 1877
Tinea dubiella Stainton, 1859
Tinea nonimella (Zagulajev, 1955)
Tinea pallescentella Stainton, 1851
Tinea pellionella Linnaeus, 1758
Tinea semifulvella Haworth, 1828
Tinea translucens Meyrick, 1917
Tinea trinotella Thunberg, 1794
Tineola bisselliella (Hummel, 1823)
Triaxomasia caprimulgella (Stainton, 1851)
Triaxomera fulvimitrella (Sodoffsky, 1830)
Triaxomera parasitella (Hübner, 1796)
Trichophaga tapetzella (Linnaeus, 1758)

Tischeriidae
Coptotriche angusticollella (Duponchel, 1843)
Coptotriche gaunacella (Duponchel, 1843)
Coptotriche heinemanni (Wocke, 1871)
Coptotriche marginea (Haworth, 1828)
Coptotriche szoecsi (Kasy, 1961)
Tischeria decidua Wocke, 1876
Tischeria dodonaea Stainton, 1858
Tischeria ekebladella (Bjerkander, 1795)

Tortricidae
Acleris abietana (Hübner, 1822)
Acleris aspersana (Hübner, 1817)
Acleris bergmanniana (Linnaeus, 1758)
Acleris cristana (Denis & Schiffermüller, 1775)
Acleris emargana (Fabricius, 1775)
Acleris ferrugana (Denis & Schiffermüller, 1775)
Acleris fimbriana (Thunberg, 1791)
Acleris forsskaleana (Linnaeus, 1758)
Acleris hastiana (Linnaeus, 1758)
Acleris holmiana (Linnaeus, 1758)
Acleris kochiella (Goeze, 1783)
Acleris lacordairana (Duponchel, 1836)
Acleris lipsiana (Denis & Schiffermüller, 1775)
Acleris literana (Linnaeus, 1758)
Acleris logiana (Clerck, 1759)
Acleris lorquiniana (Duponchel, 1835)
Acleris notana (Donovan, 1806)
Acleris permutana (Duponchel, 1836)
Acleris quercinana (Zeller, 1849)
Acleris rhombana (Denis & Schiffermüller, 1775)
Acleris roscidana (Hübner, 1799)
Acleris rufana (Denis & Schiffermüller, 1775)
Acleris scabrana (Denis & Schiffermüller, 1775)
Acleris schalleriana (Linnaeus, 1761)
Acleris shepherdana (Stephens, 1852)
Acleris sparsana (Denis & Schiffermüller, 1775)
Acleris umbrana (Hübner, 1799)
Acleris variegana (Denis & Schiffermüller, 1775)
Adoxophyes orana (Fischer v. Röslerstamm, 1834)
Aethes beatricella (Walsingham, 1898)
Aethes bilbaensis (Rossler, 1877)
Aethes cnicana (Westwood, 1854)
Aethes dilucidana (Stephens, 1852)
Aethes flagellana (Duponchel, 1836)
Aethes francillana (Fabricius, 1794)
Aethes hartmanniana (Clerck, 1759)
Aethes kindermanniana (Treitschke, 1830)
Aethes margaritana (Haworth, 1811)
Aethes margarotana (Duponchel, 1836)
Aethes moribundana (Staudinger, 1859)
Aethes nefandana (Kennel, 1899)
Aethes rubigana (Treitschke, 1830)
Aethes rutilana (Hübner, 1817)
Aethes sanguinana (Treitschke, 1830)
Aethes smeathmanniana (Fabricius, 1781)
Aethes tesserana (Denis & Schiffermüller, 1775)
Aethes tornella (Walsingham, 1898)
Aethes triangulana (Treitschke, 1835)
Aethes williana (Brahm, 1791)
Agapeta hamana (Linnaeus, 1758)
Agapeta largana (Rebel, 1906)
Agapeta zoegana (Linnaeus, 1767)
Aleimma loeflingiana (Linnaeus, 1758)
Ancylis achatana (Denis & Schiffermüller, 1775)
Ancylis apicella (Denis & Schiffermüller, 1775)
Ancylis badiana (Denis & Schiffermüller, 1775)
Ancylis comptana (Frolich, 1828)
Ancylis diminutana (Haworth, 1811)
Ancylis geminana (Donovan, 1806)
Ancylis laetana (Fabricius, 1775)
Ancylis mitterbacheriana (Denis & Schiffermüller, 1775)
Ancylis myrtillana (Treitschke, 1830)
Ancylis obtusana (Haworth, 1811)
Ancylis paludana Barrett, 1871
Ancylis selenana (Guenee, 1845)
Ancylis subarcuana (Douglas, 1847)
Ancylis tineana (Hübner, 1799)
Ancylis uncella (Denis & Schiffermüller, 1775)
Ancylis unculana (Haworth, 1811)
Ancylis unguicella (Linnaeus, 1758)
Ancylis upupana (Treitschke, 1835)
Aphelia viburniana (Denis & Schiffermüller, 1775)
Aphelia ferugana (Hübner, 1793)
Aphelia paleana (Hübner, 1793)
Apotomis betuletana (Haworth, 1811)
Apotomis capreana (Hübner, 1817)
Apotomis inundana (Denis & Schiffermüller, 1775)
Apotomis lineana (Denis & Schiffermüller, 1775)
Apotomis sauciana (Frolich, 1828)
Apotomis semifasciana (Haworth, 1811)
Apotomis sororculana (Zetterstedt, 1839)
Apotomis turbidana Hübner, 1825
Archips crataegana (Hübner, 1799)
Archips oporana (Linnaeus, 1758)
Archips podana (Scopoli, 1763)
Archips rosana (Linnaeus, 1758)
Archips xylosteana (Linnaeus, 1758)
Argyroploce roseomaculana (Herrich-Schäffer, 1851)
Argyrotaenia ljungiana (Thunberg, 1797)
Aterpia corticana (Denis & Schiffermüller, 1775)
Bactra furfurana (Haworth, 1811)
Bactra lacteana Caradja, 1916
Bactra lancealana (Hübner, 1799)
Bactra robustana (Christoph, 1872)
Cacoecimorpha pronubana (Hübner, 1799)
Capua vulgana (Frolich, 1828)
Celypha aurofasciana (Haworth, 1811)
Celypha capreolana (Herrich-Schäffer, 1851)
Celypha cespitana (Hübner, 1817)
Celypha flavipalpana (Herrich-Schäffer, 1851)
Celypha lacunana (Denis & Schiffermüller, 1775)
Celypha rivulana (Scopoli, 1763)
Celypha rufana (Scopoli, 1763)
Celypha rurestrana (Duponchel, 1843)
Celypha siderana (Treitschke, 1835)
Celypha striana (Denis & Schiffermüller, 1775)
Celypha woodiana (Barrett, 1882)
Choristoneura diversana (Hübner, 1817)
Choristoneura hebenstreitella (Muller, 1764)
Choristoneura murinana (Hübner, 1799)
Clepsis consimilana (Hübner, 1817)
Clepsis pallidana (Fabricius, 1776)
Clepsis rolandriana (Linnaeus, 1758)
Clepsis rurinana (Linnaeus, 1758)
Clepsis senecionana (Hübner, 1819)
Clepsis spectrana (Treitschke, 1830)
Cnephasia alticolana (Herrich-Schäffer, 1851)
Cnephasia asseclana (Denis & Schiffermüller, 1775)
Cnephasia chrysantheana (Duponchel, 1843)
Cnephasia communana (Herrich-Schäffer, 1851)
Cnephasia ecullyana Real, 1951
Cnephasia genitalana Pierce & Metcalfe, 1922
Cnephasia oxyacanthana (Herrich-Schäffer, 1851)
Cnephasia pasiuana (Hübner, 1799)
Cnephasia stephensiana (Doubleday, 1849)
Cnephasia abrasana (Duponchel, 1843)
Cnephasia incertana (Treitschke, 1835)
Cochylidia heydeniana (Herrich-Schäffer, 1851)
Cochylidia implicitana (Wocke, 1856)
Cochylidia moguntiana (Rossler, 1864)
Cochylidia richteriana (Fischer v. Röslerstamm, 1837)
Cochylidia rupicola (Curtis, 1834)
Cochylidia subroseana (Haworth, 1811)
Cochylimorpha alternana (Stephens, 1834)
Cochylimorpha elongana (Fischer v. Röslerstamm, 1839)
Cochylimorpha halophilana (Christoph, 1872)
Cochylimorpha hilarana (Herrich-Schäffer, 1851)
Cochylimorpha jucundana (Treitschke, 1835)
Cochylimorpha obliquana (Eversmann, 1844)
Cochylimorpha perfusana (Guenee, 1845)
Cochylimorpha straminea (Haworth, 1811)
Cochylimorpha woliniana (Schleich, 1868)
Cochylis atricapitana (Stephens, 1852)
Cochylis dubitana (Hübner, 1799)
Cochylis epilinana Duponchel, 1842
Cochylis flaviciliana (Westwood, 1854)
Cochylis hybridella (Hübner, 1813)
Cochylis nana (Haworth, 1811)
Cochylis pallidana Zeller, 1847
Cochylis posterana Zeller, 1847
Cochylis roseana (Haworth, 1811)
Cochylis salebrana (Mann, 1862)
Corticivora piniana (Herrich-Schäffer, 1851)
Crocidosema plebejana Zeller, 1847
Cryptocochylis conjunctana (Mann, 1864)
Cydia amplana (Hübner, 1800)
Cydia conicolana (Heylaerts, 1874)
Cydia coniferana (Saxesen, 1840)
Cydia corollana (Hübner, 1823)
Cydia cosmophorana (Treitschke, 1835)
Cydia duplicana (Zetterstedt, 1839)
Cydia exquisitana (Rebel, 1889)
Cydia fagiglandana (Zeller, 1841)
Cydia grunertiana (Ratzeburg, 1868)
Cydia illutana (Herrich-Schäffer, 1851)
Cydia inquinatana (Hübner, 1800)
Cydia leguminana (Lienig & Zeller, 1846)
Cydia medicaginis (Kuznetsov, 1962)
Cydia microgrammana (Guenee, 1845)
Cydia millenniana (Adamczewski, 1967)
Cydia nigricana (Fabricius, 1794)
Cydia oxytropidis (Martini, 1912)
Cydia pactolana (Zeller, 1840)
Cydia pomonella (Linnaeus, 1758)
Cydia pyrivora (Danilevsky, 1947)
Cydia servillana (Duponchel, 1836)
Cydia splendana (Hübner, 1799)
Cydia strobilella (Linnaeus, 1758)
Cydia succedana (Denis & Schiffermüller, 1775)
Cymolomia hartigiana (Saxesen, 1840)
Diceratura ostrinana (Guenee, 1845)
Dichelia histrionana (Frolich, 1828)
Dichrorampha acuminatana (Lienig & Zeller, 1846)
Dichrorampha aeratana (Pierce & Metcalfe, 1915)
Dichrorampha agilana (Tengstrom, 1848)
Dichrorampha alpinana (Treitschke, 1830)
Dichrorampha cinerascens (Danilevsky, 1948)
Dichrorampha cinerosana (Herrich-Schäffer, 1851)
Dichrorampha consortana Stephens, 1852
Dichrorampha distinctana (Heinemann, 1863)
Dichrorampha flavidorsana Knaggs, 1867
Dichrorampha gruneriana (Herrich-Schäffer, 1851)
Dichrorampha heegerana (Duponchel, 1843)
Dichrorampha montanana (Duponchel, 1843)
Dichrorampha obscuratana (Wolff, 1955)
Dichrorampha petiverella (Linnaeus, 1758)
Dichrorampha plumbagana (Treitschke, 1830)
Dichrorampha plumbana (Scopoli, 1763)
Dichrorampha podoliensis (Toll, 1942)
Dichrorampha sedatana Busck, 1906
Dichrorampha senectana Guenee, 1845
Dichrorampha sequana (Hübner, 1799)
Dichrorampha simpliciana (Haworth, 1811)
Dichrorampha vancouverana McDunnough, 1935
Doloploca punctulana (Denis & Schiffermüller, 1775)
Eana derivana (de La Harpe, 1858)
Eana incanana (Stephens, 1852)
Eana argentana (Clerck, 1759)
Eana osseana (Scopoli, 1763)
Eana canescana (Guenee, 1845)
Enarmonia formosana (Scopoli, 1763)
Endothenia gentianaeana (Hübner, 1799)
Endothenia lapideana (Herrich-Schäffer, 1851)
Endothenia marginana (Haworth, 1811)
Endothenia nigricostana (Haworth, 1811)
Endothenia oblongana (Haworth, 1811)
Endothenia quadrimaculana (Haworth, 1811)
Endothenia sororiana (Herrich-Schäffer, 1850)
Endothenia ustulana (Haworth, 1811)
Epagoge grotiana (Fabricius, 1781)
Epibactra immundana (Eversmann, 1844)
Epiblema cnicicolana (Zeller, 1847)
Epiblema foenella (Linnaeus, 1758)
Epiblema grandaevana (Lienig & Zeller, 1846)
Epiblema graphana (Treitschke, 1835)
Epiblema hepaticana (Treitschke, 1835)
Epiblema inulivora (Meyrick, 1932)
Epiblema junctana (Herrich-Schäffer, 1856)
Epiblema mendiculana (Treitschke, 1835)
Epiblema scutulana (Denis & Schiffermüller, 1775)
Epiblema similana (Denis & Schiffermüller, 1775)
Epiblema sticticana (Fabricius, 1794)
Epiblema turbidana (Treitschke, 1835)
Epinotia abbreviana (Fabricius, 1794)
Epinotia bilunana (Haworth, 1811)
Epinotia brunnichana (Linnaeus, 1767)
Epinotia caprana (Fabricius, 1798)
Epinotia cruciana (Linnaeus, 1761)
Epinotia demarniana (Fischer v. Röslerstamm, 1840)
Epinotia festivana (Hübner, 1799)
Epinotia granitana (Herrich-Schäffer, 1851)
Epinotia immundana (Fischer v. Röslerstamm, 1839)
Epinotia kochiana (Herrich-Schäffer, 1851)
Epinotia maculana (Fabricius, 1775)
Epinotia nanana (Treitschke, 1835)
Epinotia nigricana (Herrich-Schäffer, 1851)
Epinotia nisella (Clerck, 1759)
Epinotia pusillana (Peyerimhoff, 1863)
Epinotia pygmaeana (Hübner, 1799)
Epinotia ramella (Linnaeus, 1758)
Epinotia rubiginosana (Herrich-Schäffer, 1851)
Epinotia signatana (Douglas, 1845)
Epinotia solandriana (Linnaeus, 1758)
Epinotia sordidana (Hübner, 1824)
Epinotia subocellana (Donovan, 1806)
Epinotia tedella (Clerck, 1759)
Epinotia tenerana (Denis & Schiffermüller, 1775)
Epinotia tetraquetrana (Haworth, 1811)
Epinotia thapsiana (Zeller, 1847)
Epinotia trigonella (Linnaeus, 1758)
Eriopsela quadrana (Hübner, 1813)
Eucosma aemulana (Schlager, 1849)
Eucosma albidulana (Herrich-Schäffer, 1851)
Eucosma aspidiscana (Hübner, 1817)
Eucosma balatonana (Osthelder, 1937)
Eucosma campoliliana (Denis & Schiffermüller, 1775)
Eucosma cana (Haworth, 1811)
Eucosma conformana (Mann, 1872)
Eucosma conterminana (Guenee, 1845)
Eucosma cumulana (Guenee, 1845)
Eucosma fervidana (Zeller, 1847)
Eucosma flavispecula Kuznetsov, 1964
Eucosma hohenwartiana (Denis & Schiffermüller, 1775)
Eucosma lacteana (Treitschke, 1835)
Eucosma lugubrana (Treitschke, 1830)
Eucosma messingiana (Fischer v. Röslerstamm, 1837)
Eucosma metzneriana (Treitschke, 1830)
Eucosma obumbratana (Lienig & Zeller, 1846)
Eucosma parvulana (Wilkinson, 1859)
Eucosma pupillana (Clerck, 1759)
Eucosma tripoliana (Barrett, 1880)
Eucosma tundrana (Kennel, 1900)
Eucosma wimmerana (Treitschke, 1835)
Eucosmomorpha albersana (Hübner, 1813)
Eudemis porphyrana (Hübner, 1799)
Eudemis profundana (Denis & Schiffermüller, 1775)
Eugnosta lathoniana (Hübner, 1800)
Eugnosta magnificana (Rebel, 1914)
Eulia ministrana (Linnaeus, 1758)
Eupoecilia ambiguella (Hübner, 1796)
Eupoecilia angustana (Hübner, 1799)
Eupoecilia sanguisorbana (Herrich-Schäffer, 1856)
Falseuncaria degreyana (McLachlan, 1869)
Falseuncaria ruficiliana (Haworth, 1811)
Fulvoclysia nerminae Kocak, 1982
Gibberifera simplana (Fischer v. Röslerstamm, 1836)
Grapholita funebrana Treitschke, 1835
Grapholita janthinana (Duponchel, 1843)
Grapholita lobarzewskii (Nowicki, 1860)
Grapholita molesta (Busck, 1916)
Grapholita tenebrosana Duponchel, 1843
Grapholita caecana Schlager, 1847
Grapholita compositella (Fabricius, 1775)
Grapholita coronillana Lienig & Zeller, 1846
Grapholita delineana Walker, 1863
Grapholita difficilana (Walsingham, 1900)
Grapholita discretana Wocke, 1861
Grapholita fissana (Frolich, 1828)
Grapholita gemmiferana Treitschke, 1835
Grapholita jungiella (Clerck, 1759)
Grapholita larseni Rebel, 1903
Grapholita lathyrana (Hübner, 1822)
Grapholita lunulana (Denis & Schiffermüller, 1775)
Grapholita nebritana Treitschke, 1830
Grapholita orobana Treitschke, 1830
Grapholita pallifrontana Lienig & Zeller, 1846
Gravitarmata margarotana (Heinemann, 1863)
Gynnidomorpha alismana (Ragonot, 1883)
Gynnidomorpha luridana (Gregson, 1870)
Gynnidomorpha minimana (Caradja, 1916)
Gynnidomorpha permixtana (Denis & Schiffermüller, 1775)
Gynnidomorpha vectisana (Humphreys & Westwood, 1845)
Gypsonoma aceriana (Duponchel, 1843)
Gypsonoma dealbana (Frolich, 1828)
Gypsonoma minutana (Hübner, 1799)
Gypsonoma nitidulana (Lienig & Zeller, 1846)
Gypsonoma obraztsovi Amsel, 1959
Gypsonoma oppressana (Treitschke, 1835)
Gypsonoma sociana (Haworth, 1811)
Hedya dimidiana (Clerck, 1759)
Hedya nubiferana (Haworth, 1811)
Hedya ochroleucana (Frolich, 1828)
Hedya pruniana (Hübner, 1799)
Hedya salicella (Linnaeus, 1758)
Hysterophora maculosana (Haworth, 1811)
Isotrias hybridana (Hübner, 1817)
Isotrias rectifasciana (Haworth, 1811)
Lathronympha strigana (Fabricius, 1775)
Lepteucosma huebneriana Kocak, 1980
Lobesia abscisana (Doubleday, 1849)
Lobesia artemisiana (Zeller, 1847)
Lobesia bicinctana (Duponchel, 1844)
Lobesia botrana (Denis & Schiffermüller, 1775)
Lobesia reliquana (Hübner, 1825)
Lobesia euphorbiana (Freyer, 1842)
Lozotaenia forsterana (Fabricius, 1781)
Metendothenia atropunctana (Zetterstedt, 1839)
Neosphaleroptera nubilana (Hübner, 1799)
Notocelia cynosbatella (Linnaeus, 1758)
Notocelia incarnatana (Hübner, 1800)
Notocelia roborana (Denis & Schiffermüller, 1775)
Notocelia trimaculana (Haworth, 1811)
Notocelia uddmanniana (Linnaeus, 1758)
Olethreutes arcuella (Clerck, 1759)
Olindia schumacherana (Fabricius, 1787)
Oporopsamma wertheimsteini (Rebel, 1913)
Orthotaenia undulana (Denis & Schiffermüller, 1775)
Pammene agnotana Rebel, 1914
Pammene albuginana (Guenee, 1845)
Pammene amygdalana (Duponchel, 1842)
Pammene argyrana (Hübner, 1799)
Pammene aurana (Fabricius, 1775)
Pammene aurita Razowski, 1991
Pammene christophana (Moschler, 1862)
Pammene fasciana (Linnaeus, 1761)
Pammene gallicana (Guenee, 1845)
Pammene gallicolana (Lienig & Zeller, 1846)
Pammene germmana (Hübner, 1799)
Pammene giganteana (Peyerimhoff, 1863)
Pammene ignorata Kuznetsov, 1968
Pammene insulana (Guenee, 1845)
Pammene obscurana (Stephens, 1834)
Pammene ochsenheimeriana (Lienig & Zeller, 1846)
Pammene querceti (Gozmany, 1957)
Pammene regiana (Zeller, 1849)
Pammene rhediella (Clerck, 1759)
Pammene spiniana (Duponchel, 1843)
Pammene splendidulana (Guenee, 1845)
Pammene suspectana (Lienig & Zeller, 1846)
Pammene trauniana (Denis & Schiffermüller, 1775)
Pandemis cerasana (Hübner, 1786)
Pandemis cinnamomeana (Treitschke, 1830)
Pandemis corylana (Fabricius, 1794)
Pandemis dumetana (Treitschke, 1835)
Pandemis heparana (Denis & Schiffermüller, 1775)
Paramesia gnomana (Clerck, 1759)
Pelatea klugiana (Freyer, 1836)
Pelochrista arabescana (Eversmann, 1844)
Pelochrista caecimaculana (Hübner, 1799)
Pelochrista decolorana (Freyer, 1842)
Pelochrista hepatariana (Herrich-Schäffer, 1851)
Pelochrista infidana (Hübner, 1824)
Pelochrista latericiana (Rebel, 1919)
Pelochrista modicana (Zeller, 1847)
Pelochrista mollitana (Zeller, 1847)
Pelochrista subtiliana (Jackh, 1960)
Periclepsis cinctana (Denis & Schiffermüller, 1775)
Phalonidia affinitana (Douglas, 1846)
Phalonidia albipalpana (Zeller, 1847)
Phalonidia contractana (Zeller, 1847)
Phalonidia curvistrigana (Stainton, 1859)
Phalonidia gilvicomana (Zeller, 1847)
Phalonidia manniana (Fischer v. Röslerstamm, 1839)
Phaneta pauperana (Duponchel, 1843)
Phiaris micana (Denis & Schiffermüller, 1775)
Phiaris obsoletana (Zetterstedt, 1839)
Phiaris scoriana (Guenee, 1845)
Phiaris stibiana (Guenee, 1845)
Phiaris umbrosana (Freyer, 1842)
Philedone gerningana (Denis & Schiffermüller, 1775)
Philedonides lunana (Thunberg, 1784)
Philedonides rhombicana (Herrich-Schäffer, 1851)
Phtheochroa annae Huemer, 1990
Phtheochroa duponchelana (Duponchel, 1843)
Phtheochroa fulvicinctana (Constant, 1893)
Phtheochroa inopiana (Haworth, 1811)
Phtheochroa procerana (Lederer, 1853)
Phtheochroa pulvillana Herrich-Schäffer, 1851
Phtheochroa purana (Guenee, 1845)
Phtheochroa rugosana (Hübner, 1799)
Phtheochroa schreibersiana (Frolich, 1828)
Phtheochroa sodaliana (Haworth, 1811)
Piniphila bifasciana (Haworth, 1811)
Pristerognatha penthinana (Guenee, 1845)
Prochlidonia amiantana (Hübner, 1799)
Pseudargyrotoza conwagana (Fabricius, 1775)
Pseudeulia asinana (Hübner, 1799)
Pseudococcyx posticana (Zetterstedt, 1839)
Pseudococcyx turionella (Linnaeus, 1758)
Pseudohermenias abietana (Fabricius, 1787)
Pseudosciaphila branderiana (Linnaeus, 1758)
Ptycholoma lecheana (Linnaeus, 1758)
Ptycholomoides aeriferana (Herrich-Schäffer, 1851)
Retinia resinella (Linnaeus, 1758)
Rhopobota myrtillana (Humphreys & Westwood, 1845)
Rhopobota naevana (Hübner, 1817)
Rhopobota stagnana (Denis & Schiffermüller, 1775)
Rhyacionia buoliana (Denis & Schiffermüller, 1775)
Rhyacionia duplana (Hübner, 1813)
Rhyacionia hafneri (Rebel, 1937)
Rhyacionia pinicolana (Doubleday, 1849)
Rhyacionia pinivorana (Lienig & Zeller, 1846)
Selania leplastriana (Curtis, 1831)
Selenodes karelica (Tengstrom, 1875)
Sparganothis pilleriana (Denis & Schiffermüller, 1775)
Spatalistis bifasciana (Hübner, 1787)
Spilonota laricana (Heinemann, 1863)
Spilonota ocellana (Denis & Schiffermüller, 1775)
Strophedra nitidana (Fabricius, 1794)
Strophedra weirana (Douglas, 1850)
Syndemis musculana (Hübner, 1799)
Thiodia citrana (Hübner, 1799)
Thiodia lerneana (Treitschke, 1835)
Thiodia torridana (Lederer, 1859)
Thiodia trochilana (Frolich, 1828)
Tortricodes alternella (Denis & Schiffermüller, 1775)
Tortrix viridana Linnaeus, 1758
Tosirips magyarus Razowski, 1987
Xerocnephasia rigana (Sodoffsky, 1829)
Zeiraphera griseana (Hübner, 1799)
Zeiraphera isertana (Fabricius, 1794)
Zeiraphera ratzeburgiana (Saxesen, 1840)
Zeiraphera rufimitrana (Herrich-Schäffer, 1851)

Urodidae
Wockia asperipunctella (Bruand, 1851)

Yponomeutidae
Cedestis gysseleniella Zeller, 1839
Cedestis subfasciella (Stephens, 1834)
Euhyponomeuta stannella (Thunberg, 1788)
Niphonympha dealbatella (Zeller, 1847)
Paraswammerdamia nebulella (Goeze, 1783)
Pseudoswammerdamia combinella (Hübner, 1786)
Scythropia crataegella (Linnaeus, 1767)
Swammerdamia caesiella (Hübner, 1796)
Swammerdamia compunctella Herrich-Schäffer, 1855
Swammerdamia pyrella (Villers, 1789)
Yponomeuta cagnagella (Hübner, 1813)
Yponomeuta evonymella (Linnaeus, 1758)
Yponomeuta irrorella (Hübner, 1796)
Yponomeuta malinellus Zeller, 1838
Yponomeuta padella (Linnaeus, 1758)
Yponomeuta plumbella (Denis & Schiffermüller, 1775)
Yponomeuta rorrella (Hübner, 1796)
Yponomeuta sedella Treitschke, 1832

Ypsolophidae
Ochsenheimeria capella Moschler, 1860
Ochsenheimeria taurella (Denis & Schiffermüller, 1775)
Ochsenheimeria urella Fischer von Röslerstamm, 1842
Ochsenheimeria vacculella Fischer von Röslerstamm, 1842
Ypsolopha alpella (Denis & Schiffermüller, 1775)
Ypsolopha asperella (Linnaeus, 1761)
Ypsolopha chazariella (Mann, 1866)
Ypsolopha dentella (Fabricius, 1775)
Ypsolopha falcella (Denis & Schiffermüller, 1775)
Ypsolopha horridella (Treitschke, 1835)
Ypsolopha leuconotella (Snellen, 1884)
Ypsolopha lucella (Fabricius, 1775)
Ypsolopha mucronella (Scopoli, 1763)
Ypsolopha parenthesella (Linnaeus, 1761)
Ypsolopha persicella (Fabricius, 1787)
Ypsolopha scabrella (Linnaeus, 1761)
Ypsolopha sequella (Clerck, 1759)
Ypsolopha sylvella (Linnaeus, 1767)
Ypsolopha ustella (Clerck, 1759)
Ypsolopha vittella (Linnaeus, 1758)

Zygaenidae
Adscita geryon (Hübner, 1813)
Adscita statices (Linnaeus, 1758)
Jordanita chloros (Hübner, 1813)
Jordanita fazekasi Efetov, 1998
Jordanita globulariae (Hübner, 1793)
Jordanita graeca (Jordan, 1907)
Jordanita subsolana (Staudinger, 1862)
Jordanita budensis (Ad. & Au. Speyer, 1858)
Jordanita notata (Zeller, 1847)
Rhagades pruni (Denis & Schiffermüller, 1775)
Theresimima ampellophaga (Bayle-Barelle, 1808)
Zygaena carniolica (Scopoli, 1763)
Zygaena brizae (Esper, 1800)
Zygaena cynarae (Esper, 1789)
Zygaena laeta (Hübner, 1790)
Zygaena minos (Denis & Schiffermüller, 1775)
Zygaena punctum Ochsenheimer, 1808
Zygaena purpuralis (Brunnich, 1763)
Zygaena angelicae Ochsenheimer, 1808
Zygaena ephialtes (Linnaeus, 1767)
Zygaena filipendulae (Linnaeus, 1758)
Zygaena lonicerae (Scheven, 1777)
Zygaena loti (Denis & Schiffermüller, 1775)
Zygaena osterodensis Reiss, 1921
Zygaena viciae (Denis & Hübner, 1775)

References

External links
Fauna Europaea

Hungary
Hungary
 Hungary
Lepidoptera